This is a list of aviation-related events from 2016.

Deadliest crash
The deadliest crash of this year was a government official flight, namely the 2016 Russian Defence Ministry Tupolev Tu-154 crash, which crashed into the Black Sea near Sochi, Russia on 25 December killing all 92 people on board. The deadliest civil aviation crash of the year was EgyptAir Flight 804, an Airbus A320 which crashed into the Mediterranean Sea on 19 May, killing all 66 people on board.

Events

January
The Government of Italy permitted United States unmanned aerial vehicles (UAVs or drones) to fly strike missions from Naval Air Station Sigonella in Sicily where the US has operated unarmed surveillance UAVs since 2001 against Islamic State targets in Libya, but only if they are "defensive," protecting U.S. forces or rescuers retrieving downed pilots. Italy still prohibits offensive strikes, and reserves the right to veto U.S. missions.

2 January
Indian aerial surveillance detected gunmen entering an Indian Air Force base at Pathankot, and their security forces exchange fire with them in a housing area. Four gunmen and two Indian security personnel are killed. Gunfire erupts again two hours later, and Indian helicopters fire on gunmen. Indian security declares the base secure 14 hours later.

3 January
Indian Security forces killed two militants discovered still hiding on the base from the previous day.
An agreement between Ethiopia and the United States was announced to close a redundant United States UAV base at Arba Minch Airport in September 2015.

4 January
A day after Saudi Arabia severed diplomatic relations with Iran it suspended civilian flights between the two countries raising doubts about religious pilgrims visiting each other's countries.
The owner of a drone that was over private property is suing the owner of the property who shot it down, believing it to be spying on him and his family. The drone operator is looking to the U.S. judicial system to clarify the boundaries between private property rights end and federal jurisdiction.

5 January
Two United States Air Force Sikorsky HH-60 Pave Hawk helicopters were evacuating wounded Afghan troops, when one hit a wall, and the other aborted the mission under heavy fire. One American was killed and two wounded becoming the first U.S. casualties in Afghanistan of 2016.

7 January
Iran complained that a Saudi-led coalition airstrike in Yemen hit its embassy in Sana'a. Local residents and press observers were unable to confirm.
A United States Department of Transportation report to the U.S. Federal Aviation Administration (FAA) raised concerns that airline pilots have become so reliant on automation they lack the skills to take over in emergencies. The FAA responded that it will require improved pilot training, which the Air Line Pilots Association endorsed.

8 January
West Air Sweden Flight 294, a Canadair Regional Jet CRJ-200PF on a domestic cargo flight in Norway from Oslo to Tromsø, suddenly descended after a brief Mayday and crashed near Akkajaure, Sweden, killing both crew.

9 January
Tracey Curtis-Taylor completed a solo flight from England to Australia, in the Stearman open-cockpit biplane Spirit of Artemis. During the 100-day,  flight, begun on 1 October 2015, she flew over 23 countries to recreate the first solo flight by Amy Johnson between the two countries by a woman in 1930.

10 January
Following a North Korean nuclear weapons test on 6 January, a Guam-based U.S. Air Force B-52H Stratofortress flew to South Korea, where it circled Osan Air Base flanked by U.S. Air Force and Republic of Korea Air Force fighters before returning.

12 January
An unarmed Iranian UAV flies near the French Navy aircraft carrier Charles de Gaulle and overflies the United States Navy aircraft carrier  in international waters in the Persian Gulf.
A regional agreement to assist 8,000 Cuban migrants stranded in Costa Rica since Nicaragua closed its border to them on 13 November 2015, is allowing them to fly to Mexico, from where they can emigrate to the United States.

13 January
An Israeli Air Force aircraft attacked an Al-Aqsa Martyrs Brigade group on a Gaza Strip beach the Israel Defense Force said were planting explosives near the border fence.

14 January
Air France retired the Boeing 747 with a sendoff formation flight with the Patrouille de France aerobatic team, which departed Charles de Gaulle Airport in Paris and made a clockwise circuit around France before returning. Air France has operated 68 747s since 1974 which carried 250 million passengers, and will be replaced by Airbus A380s and Boeing 777s on long-haul flights.
Two United States Marine Corps Sikorsky CH-53 Sea Stallion helicopters of Marine Heavy Helicopter Squadron 463 (HMH-463), each carrying six Marines, collide and crash over the Pacific off Haleiwa, Hawaii, leaving 12 dead. The United States Coast Guard called off the search on 19 January,

15 January
A U.S. unmanned aerial vehicle-launched air-to-ground missile killed three suspected al-Qaeda in the Arabian Peninsula members in a car in Yemen's Shabwa Governorate.
SpaceX successfully fires the first stage engines of the Falcon 9 rocket. In December 2015 it will lift a satellite into orbit and land successfully, the first soft, controlled landing by a rocket stage.

16 January
Polish Minister of National Defense Antoni Macierewicz said at the conclusion of a U.S./Polish missile exercise at Skwierzyna, Poland that his government wants a permanent North Atlantic Treaty Organization (NATO) U.S. presence in Poland, with MIM-104 Patriot surface-to-air missiles.

17 January
After successfully putting the Jason-3 satellite in orbit from Vandenberg Air Force Base in California, the first stage of a SpaceX Falcon 9 rocket touched down on a floating platform in the Pacific, off California softly enough to land successfully, but fell over when a leg collapsed. It is SpaceX's third failed attempt to land a Falcon 9 first stage at sea, although a Falcon 9 successfully landed on land.
Saudi-led coalition aircraft attacked a police facility in Sana'a, Yemen used by both security forces and Houthi rebels, killing 26 and injuring 15.

21 January
A Saudi-led coalition air strike against a facility at Ras Isa on Yemen's Red Sea coast distributing petroleum products to rebels in Yemen destroyed trucks and started a fire, killing between nine and 16 people and injuring at least 30.

22 January
Saudi-led coalition aircraft made attacks across Yemen, killing dozens. Houthi rebels in Saada Governorate reported that 26 people in Dahyan, including a Doctors Without Borders ambulance driver were killed. Strikes against mountain weapon depots kill another 22, and strikes in Hodeida targeting trucks carrying oil to rebel forces kill another 10. Attacks also hit Houthis and rebel Yemeni Army units allied with them in Al Jawf Governorate, Dhamar, ad Taiz.
The United States Fish and Wildlife Service announced that after the 2016 season ultralight aircraft leading whooping cranes on their fall migration in Operation Migration will end. Whooping crane experts found that the ultralight flights prevented the cranes from learning the skills necessary to raise chicks in the wild.

26 January
The United States Department of the Treasury announced U.S. trade and travel restrictions on Cuba are to be lifted. Code sharing between U.S. and Cuban airlines, airplane leases, and U.S. airline crews travelling to Cuba are now legal.

28 January
Iran agreed to buy 12 A380, 16 A350-1000, 45 A330, and 45 A320-family aircraft from Airbus in a $27 billion deal but requires United States export licenses, where some Airbus parts are manufactured. Iran does not plan on delivery of them until ca. 2020 as airport expansions and more urgent civil aviation needs come first.

February
1 February
U.S. aircraft took the Islamic State of Afghanistan "Voice of the Caliphate" radio station off the air in Achin District in two airstrikes that with Afghan Army ground operations kill 29, including eight at the station and its Internet operation.

2 February
Daallo Airlines Flight 159 Airbus A321-100 flying from Mogadishu to Djibouti City had an explosion which blew a hole in the fuselage and ignited a passenger who was sucked out at altitude. The airliner returned to Mogadishu and the burned body was found near Balad, Somalia. Two others on board had minor injuries.

7 February
An unidentified aircraft hit a medical technology college in Derna, Libya, killing four. A coalition of Islamic militant groups hold the area against the Islamic State.

8 February
The Prime Minister of Canada Justin Trudeau announced the withdrawal of its six CF-18 Hornets from Islamic State missions within two weeks, but will extend non-combat air support until 31 March 2017, using one CC-150 Polaris aerial refueling aircraft and two CP-140 Aurora reconnaissance aircraft.
An International Civil Aviation Organization panel proposed the first global standards for carbon dioxide emissions to apply to all new aircraft designs from 2020 and to all newly delivered aircraft from 2023. Environmental groups criticized not covering aircraft from before the cutoffs.

10 February
An Orenair Boeing 777-200 had smoke in the cabin and an engine failure flying from  the Dominican Republic to Moscow, although The smoke cleared after the engine was shut down, but a tire burst during the emergency landing in Punta Cana. Passengers and crew evacuated safely.
The National Air Traffic Controllers Association president told the a Government committee that it supports a House bill to transfer 38,000 federal government workers, including 14,000 NATCA air traffic controllers with the FAA to a corporation to operate the air traffic control system.

15 February
Villagers and rebels in Somalia said a U.S. UAV crashed there while the United States said that all of its UAVs were accounted for.

17–18 February
Turkish Air Force jets bomb Kurdish camps in Iraq after a suicide car bomb killed 28 in Ankara, Turkey, on 17 February.

18 February
The US government allowed Boeing to enter into talks with airlines in Iran. Replacing Iran's aging fleet would be a significant sale for Boeing, although the company requires additional United States government approvals before selling aircraft.

19 February
United States Air Force F-15 Eagles flying from the United Kingdom attack a camp outside Sabratha, Libya, killing an Islamic State leader and 48 others.
Sir Richard Branson unveils Virgin Galactic's new VSS Unity, a SpaceShipTwo-class rocket-powered suborbital spaceplane in Mojave, California.

20 February
A U.S. airstrike on 19 February in Sabratha, Libya killed two diplomats according to the Serbian Government. The United States Department of Defense claimed the state of their bodies was inconsistent with them dying there.

21 February
British Royal Navy test pilot Eric "Winkle" Brown died at the age of 97. He survived 11 aircraft crashes and the sinking of an escort carrier, flew a record 487 different types of aircraft, and made 2,407 carrier landings, also a world record, and he made the first jet carrier landing, with a de Havilland Sea Vampire in 1945. Although retired in 1970, he continued flying until 1994.

22 February
Russia requests permission to make surveillance flights over the United States under the 2002 Treaty on Open Skies using Tupolev Tu-154 aircraft equipped with high resolution digital cameras. US Government debates between it being a small concession to keep the treaty signed by 34 countries viable or a violation of its spirit to allow surveillance unanticipated at the time.

24 February
Tara Air Flight 193 de Havilland Canada DHC-6 Twin Otter on a domestic flight in Nepal from Pokhara Airport to Jomsom Airport, crashes and burns near Dana shortly after takeoff, killing all 23 passengers.

25 February
Turkish Army Bell AH-1 Cobra helicopters attack Kurdistan Workers Party personnel travelling through mountains in Turkey's Şırnak Province, killing nine, and Turkish Air Force jets attack logistics hubs, ammunition depots, and shelters in northern Iraq, that evening.

26 February
Air Kasthamandap PAC 750XL crashes at Chilkhaya, Nepal, killing both crew and injuring all nine passengers.
Solar Impulse 2 made its first 90-minute test flight over the Pacific after repairs following being grounded in Kalaeloa, Hawaii, on 3 July 2015 when the first manned solar-powered aircraft circumnavigation attempt stopped with damaged batteries. They plan to resume in late April 2016, continuing on to Phoenix, Arizona.

27 February
Saudi-led coalition airstrikes hit a market outside Sana'a, Yemen, killing at least 30 and injuring at least 30 more.

29 February
Part of what appears to be skin from a Boeing 777 horizontal stabilizer is found on a sandbar on the Mozambique coast by a tourist, raising hopes that it is debris from Malaysian Airlines Flight 370, a Boeing 777 missing since 8 March 2014.
The National Aeronautics and Space Administration (NASA) announced a $20 million contract to Lockheed Martin for a Quiet Supersonic Technology demonstrator to reduce sonic boom noise and damage, to allow "low-boom" supersonic transports to be supersonic over populated areas.
United States made 135 airstrikes since its air campaign began in Yemen which killed over 650 al-Qaeda and 105 civilians.

March
3 March
A man finds a piece of debris with a blue border on Réunion on the Indian Ocean near where he found a flaperon from Malaysian Airlines Flight 370 in July 2015 raising hopes that it is from the same aircraft.

4 March
SpaceX launches a satellite into space using an upgraded Falcon 9 rocket, but the rocket's first stage landing on the "autonomous space port droneship" floating platform is too hard for a successful recovery.
The U.S. FAA rejected the National Transportation Safety Board (NTSB) April 2014 recommendation to establish licensing and safety standards for commercial balloon operators subject to safety inspections similar to those for commercial airplane and helicopter operators prompting the NTSB to respond that the rejection was unacceptable and that its recommendation remains open.

5 March
U.S. airstrikes by manned aircraft and unmanned aerial vehicles against an Al-Shabaab training camp in Raso, Somalia, kills over 150 personnel.

7 March
African Parks Network announced that American anti-poaching pilot Bill Fitzpatrick's body had been recovered from a crash site in Cameroon. He disappeared on 22 June 2014 while flying to Odzala-Kokoua National Park in the Republic of the Congo on their behalf, and while his airplane was found by locals in April 2015, the remote location, dense vegetation and Government of Cameroon bureaucracy delayed recovery.
Boeing announced a patent filing for a self-cleaning airplane toilet which uses a three-second burst of far-ultraviolet light. The toilet also has a hands-free tap, soap dispenser, trash flap, toilet lid, toilet seat, hand dryer, and door latch.

8 March
During a joint U.S.-Somali helicopter raid against al-Shabaab in Somalia, U.S. Special Operations Forces do not accompany the Somali forces on the raid according to the United States Department of Defense, and act only as advisors, although US crews fly the U.S. military helicopters used.

9 March
A True Aviation Antonov An-26 carrying shrimp had an engine failure shortly after takeoff from Cox's Bazar Airport in Bangladesh, and crashed into the Bay of Bengal while attempting to return, killing three of the four on board and critically injuring the fourth.
Amazon announced its lease of 20 Boeing 767-300 cargo aircraft from Air Transport Services Group as it moves toward operating its own fleet to reduce shipping costs, and its reliance on FedEx and the United Parcel Service.

12 March
A South African family contacted authorities in South Africa the previous week to report debris their son found on a  Mozambique beach on 30 December 2015 which they took to South Africa. Aviation officials will examine it to see if it is from Malaysian Airlines Flight 370.
The Israeli Air Force attacked four Hamas sites in the Gaza Strip in retaliation for a rocket attack the previous evening. Two Palestinian children are killed by an air-to-ground missile that hits their family home.

13 March
The accident investigation into the 25 March 2015 crash of Germanwings Flight 9525 leads French authorities to call for stricter international monitoring of pilot mental health and guidelines under which doctors would report pilots whose psychological condition might put flight safety at risk. The French also urge German authorities to limit legal penalties on doctors breaching patient confidentiality in good faith to report psychological problems with pilots and to define "imminent danger" to flight safety.

14 March
In retaliation for a suicide car bomb in Ankara that killed at least 37 the previous day, Turkish Air Force jets attacked at least 18 Kurdistan Workers Party positions in northern Iraq, including ammunition depots, bunkers, and shelters.

15 March
Saudi-led coalition aircraft make two attacks on a busy market in Mastaba, Yemen, killing at least 119 people and wounding 47.
An Ecuadorian Air Force IAI Arava carrying 22 Ecuadorian Army troops for parachute training and an air force crew of three crashes in Hacienda la Palmira near Shell Mera, Ecuador, killing all on board.

16 March
The United States Department of the Treasury relaxed its travel restrictions to Cuba and now allows U.S. airlines to have offices in Cuba. The changes should increase commercial air travel between the two countries.

17 March
Saudi Arabia announced its coalition will reduce operations against Houthi rebels in Yemen, maintaining only "small" teams to advise, train, and equip Yemeni forces, but will still provide air support to Yemeni forces.

19 March
Flydubai Flight 981, a Boeing 737-8KN aborts two landings in poor visibility at Rostov-on-Don Airport. It is Flydubai's first fatal accident in seven years of operation.

21 March
A South African archaeologist finds debris on a beach in South Africa. The next day, a Malaysia official announced that the debris bears an aircraft engine company logo and will be examined for any connection to Malaysian Airlines Flight 370.

22 March
Two bombs detonated at Brussels Airport in Belgium, killing at least 11 people and injuring around 100. The airport was closed until 3 April, with all flights re-routed. A third bomb later exploded at Maelbeek (or Maalbeek) metro station in the City of Brussels, killing 20 and injuring 130. The Islamic State claimed responsibility.
U.S. aircraft attack an al-Qaeda training camp in the mountains of Yemen killing "dozens".

27 March
Suspected U.S. UAV strikes hit two villages in Yemen with air-to-ground missiles, killing eight al Qaeda members. Later in the day, a U.S. aircraft bombed a former Yemeni government intelligence building in Yemen's Abyan Governorate that al Qaeda in the Arabian Peninsula used, killing 14.
The Portuguese regional airline Portugália is rebranded as Tap Express.

28 March
Unidentified aircraft thought to belong to the Saudi-led coalition attack rebel targets in Yemen's Hadhramaut region southeast of Mukalla.

29 March
A man said to be wearing an explosive belt hijacks EgyptAir Flight 181 Airbus A320-200 during a domestic flight from Alexandria, Egypt to Cairo and forces it to fly to Larnaca International Airport in Larnaca, Cyprus. He is arrested and no one is harmed.
A chartered Aero Teknic Mitsubishi MU-2 flying in bad weather crashed into the Gulf of St. Lawrence on approach to Îles-de-la-Madeleine Airport in the Magdalen Islands in Quebec, Canada, killing all seven on board. Canadian television commentator and former Minister of Transport Jean Lapierre, his wife, two brothers and a sister had been en route to Lapierre's father's funeral and are among the dead.

31 March
Heavy airstrikes by the U.S.-led coalition supportan offensive by Iraqi forces to take the Islamic State-held city of Hīt, Iraq. The coalition made 17 airstrikes in the Hīt area preparing for the offensive the previous week.
An airstrike by a U.S. UAV near Jilib, Somalia, hit a vehicle carrying senior Al-Shabaab leader Hassan Ali Dhoore and two other Al-Shabaab members.

April
2 April
From October 2015, the U.S.-led coalition in Operation Tidal Wave II made over 200 airstrikes against Islamic State oil wells, refineries, pipelines, and tanker trucks to impair finances.

3 April
The Australian government stated that hotel guests on Mauritius found the first debris possibly from the interior of missing Malaysian Airlines Flight 370 Boeing 777 the previous week which will be examined to determine if it is from the missing airliner.
Limited flight operations resume at Brussels Airport in Zaventem, Belgium, by Brussels Airlines who make three departures, following the 22 March terrorist bombings there.

4 April
Batik Air Flight 7703 Boeing 737-8GP(WL) with 56 people collides during takeoff from Halim Perdanakusuma Airport, Jakarta, Indonesia with TransNusa ATR 42-600 as it is being towed with four on board. The 737's left wing catches fire as it severs the ATR 42's vertical stabilizer and outer left wing. Everyone is evacuated safely.
Iraqi government forces enter the city of Hīt, Iraq, after a week long operation, with air support from the U.S.-led coalition.
Video released by the Syrian Arab Army, purportedly the first combat footage of the Ka-52 made public, shows Russian Kamov Ka-52 attack helicopters firing rockets at Islamic State forces in Syria near Qaryatain.
A Bell 206 sightseeing helicopter crashes in the Smoky Mountains near Sevierville, Tennessee and Great Smoky Mountains National Park, killing all five on board.
Alaska Air agrees to buy Virgin America for $2.6 billion including debt and leases in a deal worth about $4 billion. The combined airline has 1,200 daily departures and hubs in Anchorage, Alaska, Seattle, Washington, Portland, Oregon, San Francisco, California and Los Angeles, California. Virgin America began operations in 2007.

5 April
Al-Qaeda leader Ahmed Refai Taha is killed by a U.S. UAV's air-to-ground missile during a fuel stop near Idlib, Syria after leaving his Turkish sanctuary to mediate between the Nusra Front and other Islamist groups in Syria.
A surface-to-air-missile fired from rebel territory in Syria near Aleppo downs a Syrian Arab Air Force reconnaissance aircraft, whose pilot ejects.

6 April

8 April
SpaceX lands the first stage of its Falcon 9 rocket nine minutes after liftoff from Cape Canaveral on an "autonomous spaceport drone ship" floating platform in the Atlantic, off Florida, following several unsuccessful attempts.
Jetpack International vice president Nick Macomber crashes headfirst during a jet pack test flight in Denver, Colorado, falling  after a malfunction. He is released from a hospital the next day.

10 April
Unidentified aircraft conduct airstrikes around Raqqa, Syria, killing dozens of Islamic State personnel and civilians.

11 April
Two Russian Sukhoi Su-24 jets make numerous low-level passes close to the United States Navy guided-missile destroyer  which is conducting helicopter deck landing drills in the Baltic, pausing flight operations until the Su-24s depart. The ship's commanding officer criticizes one of the passes as unsafe.

12 April
A Russian Mil Mi-28N attack helicopter crashes in Syria in bad weather, killing both crew. The Russian Ministry of Defense stated that the helicopter was not shot down. Reports of Russian helicopter operations in Syria since late March lead Western military analysts to conclude that Russia's "withdrawal" of aviation forces in March was the replacement of jets with attack helicopters more suited to supporting the Syrian Arab Army against rebel forces.
Russian aircraft fly in close proximity to the U.S. Navy guided-missile destroyer USS Donald Cook (DDG-75) in the Baltic for a second day. A Kamov Ka-27 helicopter makes seven low laps around the ship that the ship's commanding officer criticizes as "unprofessional" and 40 minutes later, two Sukhoi Su-24 jets make 11 low-level passes matching a simulated attack profile.

13 April
A Sunbird Aviation Britten-Norman BN-2T Turbine Islander crashes just short of the runway at Kiunga, Papua New Guinea, killing all 12 occupants.

14 April
United States Secretary of Defense Ashton Carter announced that combat aircraft will be sent to the Philippines to conduct more air patrols jointly with Philippine forces in the South China Sea to amid growing tensions with China over competing claims in the South China Sea.

17 April
Air France resumes flights to Iran after an eight-year hiatus with a flight from Paris to Imam Khomeini International Airport in Tehran, beginning a three-times-per-week service. Air France joins Lufthansa and Austrian Airlines in providing air passenger service between Europe and Iran.

18 April
U.S. Secretary of Defense Ashton Carter announces that U.S. forces assisting Iraqi armed forces in recapturing Mosul from the Islamic State will use AH-64 Apache attack helicopters.
A Comair Boeing 737-800 operated for British Airways became the first jet with seating for over 100 passengers to land  at the Saint Helena Airport on Saint Helena during a route proving flight in advance of scheduled services, however wind shear prevented a third landing, indicating that it remains dangerous for large commercial aircraft.

19 April
Four United States Air Force A-10 Thunderbolt II close air support aircraft of the 51st Fighter Wing patrol the South China Sea west of Luzon from Clark Air Base in the Philippines, an unusual mission for the A-10. It is to be the first of a series of joint South China Sea air patrols by U.S. and Philippine forces. The People's Republic of China claims the patrolled areas as internal waters and condemned a "Cold War mentality."
A pro-Syrian-government aircraft belonged to either the Syrians or the Russians attacked the main market in Maarat al-Nu'man, Syria, with two air-to-ground rockets while crowded with people shopping for produce, killing at least 37 civilians.

20 April
United States Central Command reveals that authority to order airstrikes that might endanger civilians, originally given only to its top commander, has been delegated to its commander in Baghdad and his deputies.

21 April
After a nearly 10-month delay, Bertrand Piccard flew Solar Impulse 2 from Kalaeloa Airport in Hawaii, bound for Mountain View, California, on the ninth leg of a round-the-world flight to be the first solar-powered aircraft circumnavigation and the first to do so without using fossil fuels. This leg is expected to take about 62 hours, which was delayed since 3 July 2015, after an overheated battery caused damage and by the need to wait for long enough days to charge the batteries in flight.
The United States Court of Appeals for the District of Columbia Circuit dismisses an American Civil Liberties Union lawsuit seeking  Freedom of Information Act access to Central Intelligence Agency lethal airstrike programs using unmanned aerial vehicles outside of the then ongoing War in Afghanistan and Iraqi Civil War. The court found that releasing them "could reasonably be expected to damage national security," and that "[t]he agency's explanations as to why the records are classified are both 'logical' and 'plausible' and uncontroverted by evidence in the record."
Doug Hughes was sentenced to four months in prison for an unauthorized gyrocopter flight on 15 April 2015 protesting the influence of money in American politics that landed on the United States Capitol Building grounds in Washington, D.C. .

22 April
Syrian Arab Air Force raids on rebel-held parts of Aleppo kill at least 19 people. Additional government airstrikes in Idlib Governorate also kill people in areas under rebel control.
U.S. Central Command announces that between 10 September 2015 and 2 February 2016 its airstrikes in Iraq and Syria killed 20 civilians and injured 11 more. The airstrikes killed two civilians in Kabisa, Iraq, on 10 September 2015; eight in Atshanah, Iraq, while hitting an Islamic State mortar position on 5 October 2015; one in Ramadi, Iraq, during a strike against Islamic State combat personnel on 12 November 2015; one near Raqqa, Syria, on 10 December 2015; five in Ramadi while hitting an Islamic State checkpoint on 12 December 2015; one in Tishreen, Syria, on 24 December 2015; one in Mosul, Iraq, on 11 January 2016; and one in Al Ghazli, Syria, on 2 February 2016. Previously, the United States Department of Defense acknowledged killing 15 civilians and wounding 15 more in Iraq and Syria.

23 April
Syrian Arab Air Force airplanes attack rebel areas of Aleppo for a second day, hitting a residential area and a market in the city's Tareeq al-Bab district, killing at least 12 people.

24 April
The Syrian Arab Air Force attacks rebel areas in Aleppo for the third day in a row, killing 16 people.
Saudi-led coalition Ground forces begin an offensive against al-Qaeda in southern Yemen, advancing toward Mukalla and surrounding areas. Coalition aircraft attack targets in Mukalla, hitting the city's cultural center and Riyan Airport.

25–26 April (overnight)
An air-to-ground missile suspected to have been from a U.S. unmanned aerial vehicle  kills three prominent al-Qaeda leaders in Zinjibar, Yemen.

26 April
The Yemeni government announces that their ground troops had retaken Mukalla, adding that Saudi-led coalition airstrikes combined with artillery fire had driven al-Qaeda in the Arabian Peninsula (AQAP) from the city.
The Government of Saint Helena announces an indefinite delay to Saint Helena Airport opening to commercial traffic because of dangerous winds encountered  by Comair Boeing 737-800 on 18 April. The airport was to open in May, with scheduled commercial services beginning in October 2017.

27 April
Airstrikes by unidentified aircraft against rebels in Aleppo, Syria, destroy Doctors Without Borders and Red Cross-operated hospital, killing at least 50 people, including at least six hospital staff members including a dentist, two medical doctors and one of the area's last pediatricians as well as patients.

28 April
The Russian Ministry of Defense denies their involvement in the 27 April attack on a hospital in Aleppo, Syria.

29 April
Airstrikes against rebel-held areas in Aleppo, Syria, by unidentified aircraft destroy a medical clinic and hit other targets. Airstrikes against rebel-held areas and rebel mortar barrages have combined to kill more than 200 people in Aleppo during the preceding week.
Russia and the United States announce a renewed ceasefire scheduled to begin at midnight on 29–30 April in two parts of Syria where fighting in violation of the 27 February ceasefire escalated in April. The Russian Ministry of Defense announced that the ceasefire applies to Latakia Governorate and will last 72 hours, while the United States Department of State later announces that it also includes East Ghouta outside Damascus and has no expiration date. The agreement excludes Aleppo, where the heaviest fighting since the 27 February ceasefire happened.
A Eurocopter EC225 Super Puma helicopter operated by CHC Helikopter Service loses its main rotor in flight while carrying oil workers from the Gullfaks B oil field in the North Sea to Bergen Airport, Flesland, in Norway, and crashes on Norway's Skitholmen islet between the islands of Turøy and Toftøy, killing all 13 occupants.
United States Central Command, United States Army commander Joseph Votel, announced a U.S. Department of Defense investigation into a United States Air Force airstrike against a Doctors Without Borders hospital in Kunduz, Afghanistan, on 3 October 2015 did not find a war crime because they hit the hospital by mistake. 16 American military personnel faced disciplinary action.

30 April
Nearly 30 airstrikes hit rebel areas of Aleppo, Syria. It is the ninth day of lethal bombardments in the city, and they have killed nearly 250 people since beginning on 22 April.

May
3 May
With André Borschberg flying, Solar Impulse 2 arrived at Phoenix Goodyear Airport near Goodyear, Arizona, completing the tenth leg the first solar-powered circumnavigation.

5 May
Amazon announced it will buy up to 30 percent of Atlas Air Worldwide Holdings's stock and Atlas will buy 20 Boeing 767-300 cargo aircraft, lease them to Amazon for ten years, and operate them for Amazon.com for seven years via a subsidiary. Operations are expected to begin during the latter half of 2016 and grow to 2018. It doubles Amazon'sfleet from 20 to 40 Boeing 767-300s.

6 May
Four Islamic State members were killed near Ar-Rutbah, Iraq in attack on their vehicle, including the "military emir" of Anbar Governorate, Abu Wahib, seen in Islamic State videos, which was announced  on 9 May by the United States.
SpaceX makes a second successful landing of Falcon 9 rocket's first stage, on a platform floating in the Atlantic off Florida after launching from Cape Canaveral, after putting a Japanese satellite in orbit.

7 May
Turkish Air Force F-4 Phantom II and F-16 Fighting Falcon aircraft attacked Kurdistan Workers Party shelters, ammunition depots, and weapon positions in northern Iraq, including in the Qandil Mountains, where the group was headquartered.

9 May
Saudi-led coalition airstrikes against a camp in Amran Governorate killed at least 10 Yemeni rebels and wounded more than 15.

11 May
The United States Navy guided missile destroyer  moved to within  of Fiery Cross Reef in the South China Sea to support its claim of Freedom of navigation in what it says are international waters, against  People's Republic of China claims over the territory and adjacent waters. Three fighters joined 3 Chinese ships monitoring the destroyer.
Iran received a S-300 surface-to-air-missile system from Russia, the first of five from a 2007 order.

12 May
Malaysia announced that debris from an engine cowling with a partial Rolls-Royce logo found in March on the coast of South Africa and an interior panel from an aircraft cabin found on Rodrigues were "almost certainly" from Malaysian Airlines Flight 370.
A U.S. special operations team assisting a Ugandan assault team calls in an airstrike against an Al-Shabaab checkpoint west of Mogadishu, Somalia suspected of extorting money from travelers, killing five.
Flown by Bertrand Piccard, Solar Impulse 2 arrives at Tulsa International Airport in Oklahoma, completing the eleventh leg of the first solar-powered aerial circumnavigation.

13 May
Airstrikes suspected of having been by Syrian Arab Air Force aircraft killed at least 12 in Idlib, Syria, and injured at least 38. One report places the death toll at 15. Additional strikes reportedly occur around Zaara, Syria. The Syrian government's official Syrian Arab News Agency said that the strikes targeted Nusra Front strongholds in Idlib Governorate and Hama, and that they killed 30 members of the militant group.
Syrian Arab Air Force attacks on Nusra Front strongholds in Idlib Governorate and Hama killed at least 12-15 people, and injured at least 38. Additional strikes occurred around Zaara, Syria. The Syrian government's Syrian Arab News Agency said 30 militants were killed.
United States Air Force General Lori Robinson, previously Pacific Air Forces commander, takes command of United States Northern Command and North American Aerospace Defense Command, becoming the first woman commanding a U.S. unified combatant command.

15 May
Turkish military sources said U.S.-led coalition airstrikes and Turkish Army artillery killed 27 Islamic State personnel planning to fire rockets into Turkey from seven locations in northern Syria, near the border, which are destroyed.

17 May
At least two Chinese Shenyang J-11 fighters intercepted a United States Navy Lockheed EP-3 signals intelligence aircraft over the South China Sea. A U.S. official complained that they made an unsafe interception while China asserted that a safe distance was maintained.
The U.S. FAA announced a research program to detect UAVs near airports after 764 sightings were made in the United States in 2015, and an initial investigation earlier in May 2016 at the John F. Kennedy International Airport  which tested Federal Bureau of Investigation technology against five types of rotorcraft and fixed-wing UAVs.

18 May
A Silk Way Airlines Antonov An-12 cargo airplane had an engine failure taking off from Dwyer Airport in Afghanistan and crashed, killing seven of the nine crew.
Saab debuts its new JAS 39 Gripen E fighter in a rollout at Linköping, Sweden.

19 May
EgyptAir Flight 804 Airbus A320-232 crashed into the Mediterranean south of Karpathos, killing all 66 occupants on a flight from Paris to Cairo.
In response to a U.S. accusation that Chinese fighters made an unsafe interception over the South China Sea on 17 May, the People's Republic of China demanded that the United States cease reconnaissance flights on Chinese borders.

20 May 
Russia proposed joint Russian and U.S.-led coalition airstrikes against Jabhat al-Nusra convoys carrying weapons and reinforcements to Syria from Turkey. The U.S. responded that it had no plans to expand cooperation in Syria beyond existing flight-safety communications.

21 May
A U.S. airstrike involving several UAVs hits a vehicle near Ahmad Wal in Pakistan, reportedly killing Taliban leader Akhtar Mansour and the driver. It is the first U.S. UAV strike in that part of Pakistan.
An airstrike allegedly conducted by aircraft of the U.S.-led coalition flying into Syria from Turkey hit the Islamic State-held town of Arshaf, Syria, killing seven members of a family and as many as 10 total.

22 May
Prime Minister of Iraq Haider al-Abadi announced that Iraqi Air Force F-16 Fighting Falcons were bombing Islamic State targets in Fallujah, Iraq, in an effort involving allied militias to retake the city

23 May
U.S. airstrikes supporting the Iraqi push attacked 21 Islamic State targets in and around Fallujah since 17 May while Iraqi Air Force F-16 Fighting Falcons destroyed an Islamic State bomb factory and rocket launchers in Fallujah, and condinued into the next day.
Two Royal Netherlands Air Force Lockheed Martin F-35A Lightning IIs are the first F-35s delivered in Europe when they arrived at Leeuwarden Air Base in the Netherlands.

25 May
The brother of a taxi driver killed in the 21 May U.S. UAV strike that killed Taliban leader Akhtar Mansour filed a police report in Balochistan, Pakistan, requesting his brother's death be investigated, noting that the United States claimed responsibility.
Russia announced a hiatus in airstrikes in Syria against Jabhat al-Nusra to allow rebels not affiliated with the group to distance themselves.
Solar Impulse 2 is flown by  Bertrand Piccard from Dayton International Airport in Ohio, to Lehigh Valley International Airport in Pennsylvania, completing the thirteenth leg of the first solar-powered circumnavigation.
U.S. Transportation Security Administration (TSA) Administrator Peter V. Neffenger testified that 740 million people will pass U.S. airport TSA checkpoints during the summer travel season, 97 million more than in 2013, and that TSA's 45,000 people are insufficient to prevent excessively long lines, despite cancelling 1,600 layoffs and hiring 768 agents. Part-time TSA employees will be made full-time, and trusted traveler programs will increase enrolment from 9.5 to 25 million.

26 May
A U.S.-led coalition attack in Fallujah, Iraq, killed Maher al-Bilawi, the Islamic State forces commander in the city.
An American Airlines vice president and airport authorities in three cities ask U.S. Congress for action to reduce lines at U.S. airport security checkpoints. Programs increasing efficiency and security were eliminated without compensating for longer processing times."

27 May
Korean Air Flight 2708 Boeing 777-300 aborted its takeoff due to an engine failure and fire at Haneda Airport in Tokyo, Japan and during the evacuation twelve of the 319 people were injured.
The U.S.-led coalition has conducted 20 airstrikes against Islamic State targets in Fallujah, Iraq, since 24 May, killing 70 Islamic State personnel.
Russia warns that it will escalate its air campaign in Syria if the United States does not respond positively to its long-standing proposal to conduct joint airstrikes in Syria.
A U.S. airstrike kills Abdullahi Haji Da’ud, Al-Shabaab's top commander, as he travels in southern Somalia.
A Vietnamese man, Minh Quang Pham, is sentenced to 40 years in prison for providing material support to al-Qaeda in a 2011 plot to bomb Heathrow Airport in London.
A World War II-era P-47 Thunderbolt crashes into the Hudson River off Edgewater, New Jersey, killing its pilot.

29 May
Lufthansa announced it is suspending service to Venezuela on 18 June, as Venezuela owed it millions of United States dollars in ticket revenues and that Venezuela's currency controls make it difficult to convert ticket sales revenue to dollars. They hope to restore service in the near future.

30 May
Heavy late-evening strikes by three unidentified aircraft – reported to be Russian – against buildings around the National Hospital in Idlib, Syria, kill at least 23 and perhaps as many as 50 people and injure about 250 others. Over the preceding weekend, Russian and Syrian aircraft conducted hundreds of attacks against rebel areas in Aleppo, Syria.
LATAM Airlines Group announces that its subsidiary airlines will suspend service to Venezuela, making it the second airline company to do so. Venezuela's currency controls make it difficult for airlines to convert ticket sales revenue to United States dollars to cover the cost of operating in Venezuela. LATAM plans for its subsidiary airlines to cease service between Caracas, Venezuela, and São Paulo, Brazil, first, with suspension of service between Caracas and Lima, Peru, and between Caracas and Santiago, Chile, to halt by 31 July.

31 May
The U.S. Transportation Security Administration reported that anticipated delays at U.S. airport security checkpoints on the Memorial Day weekend did not happen. Wait times averaged under 10 minutes nationwide, and the majority of the 10.3 million passengers waited under 30 minutes. The longest wait was in Kansas City, Missouri on 26 May, of 75 minutes.

June
88 of Iran's 250 commercial aircraft are grounded over a lack of spares due to sanctions imposed since the Iranian Revolution of 1979 that prevent replacement purchases.

1 June
The French Navy survey ship Laplace detects signals in the Mediterranean believed to be from the flight recorder of EgyptAir Flight 804 Airbus A320-232 which crashed on 19 May.

2 June
Two U.S. military flight demonstration squadrons have crashes on the same day. A United States Air Force Thunderbirds F-16 Fighting Falcon crashes after its pilot ejects safely in Colorado Springs, Colorado, just after performing a flypast for the United States Air Force Academy 2016 graduation ceremony. Hours later, a United States Navy Blue Angels F/A-18 Hornet crashes in Smyrna, Tennessee, while practising for an air show, killing its pilot.

3 June
The United Nations Security Council agrees to formally request the Syrian government to allow airlifts of food and medical supplies to civilians in besieged, rebel areas of Syria. United Nations representatives will make the request in Damascus, Syria, on 5 June. The Syrian government has not permitted deliveries of humanitarian aid despite an international task force's 1 June deadline for it to permit access.
The U.S. Navy announced that Carrier Air Wing Seven on the aircraft carrier  initiated airstrikes on the Islamic State from the Mediterranean, the first time that U.S. carrier aircraft have made attacks in the Middle East from the Mediterranean since the beginning of the Iraq War in 2003.
A Guardian Air Dassault Falcon 20 air ambulance arrives at Saint Helena Airport to make Saint Helena's first medical evacuation flight, which departs the next morning, with a critically ill baby and its mother to Cape Town, South Africa.

4 June
A fourth aircraft, an 36-year-old Airbus A300, is sunk as an artificial reef and dive site in the Aegean near Kuşadası, Turkey. It  may be the largest aircraft sunk deliberately as a reef or dive site.

5 June
United States Secretary of State John Kerry warns the People's Republic of China about declaring an air defense identification zone over the South China Sea, as doing so would be a "provocative and destabilizing act."

6 June
Foreign Minister of Russia Sergei Lavrov announces that Russia will increase airstrikes around Aleppo, Syria, in support of Syrian government forces facing a Jabhat al-Nusra offensive.

7 June
Two Chinese Chengdu J-10 fighters intercepted a U.S. Air Force Boeing RC-135 electronic surveillance airplane over the East China Sea in what the U.S. described as an "unsafe" manner. The Chinese Ministry of Foreign Affairs responded that their pilots did nothing unsafe, and protested "frequent close reconnaissance on China's coast by U.S. military aircraft."
U.S. Transportation Security Administration (TSA) Administrator Peter V. Neffenger testified that it reduced delays at its airport checkpoints by faster screening of passengers at seven airports. The program's success over the Memorial Day weekend spurred TSA to expand it to 13 more. He expected 768 new TSA agents during June and if approved, will make 2,784 part-time workers full-time.

9 June
The Al Sumaria television network reported a U.S.-led coalition airstrike on an Islamic State headquarters in Iraq's Nineveh Governorate injured Islamic State leader Abu Bakr al-Baghdadi and others.

10 June
Luminati Aerospace's solar-powered VO-Substrata UAV makes its first public test flight over Long Island, New York, for about 20 minutes with a pilot on board, although it is configured for unmanned flight. It is the prototype for a fleet they hope to provide Internet service to over 4 billion people worldwide with from late 2016.
United States Department of Defense officials announced that in late May 2016 President Barack Obama granted U.S. military commanders in Afghanistan expanded powers to assist Afghan forces against the Taliban including authorization to order airstrikes supporting Afghan offensive operations against the Taliban if the attacks are expected to have a "strategic effect." Previously, these had been authorized only to defend U.S. personnel, Afghan forces facing serious danger, or in counterterrorism operations.
The F-35 Lightning II makes its international airshow debut when two Royal Netherlands Air Force F-35A aircraft perform at the Luchtmachtdagen 2016 airshow at Leeuwarden Air Base in the Netherlands.
The United States Department of Transportation permits American Airlines, Frontier Airlines, JetBlue, Silver Airways, Southwest Airlines, and Sun Country Airlines to provide scheduled airline services between the United States and Cuba for the first in over 50 years, joining the 46 non-U.S. airlines that serve Cuba. The airlines are to make 155 round-trips per week between five U.S. cities (Chicago, Illinois; Fort Lauderdale, Florida; Miami, Florida; Minneapolis, Minnesota; and Philadelphia, Pennsylvania) and nine Cuban destinations (Camagüey, Cayo Coco, Cayo Largo del Sur, Cienfuegos, Holguín, Manzanillo, Matanzas, Santa Clara, and Santiago de Cuba)  beginning in late 2016 or early 2017. Havana is expected to be added later in the summer of 2016. U.S. law still prohibits tourist travel but it permits other types of travel, including family visits, official business, journalist visits, professional meetings and educational and religious activities.

11 June
Around 2,000 people protest at Ramstein Air Base in Germany over the U.S. practice of "drone war," using unmanned aerial vehicles to make attacks.
Solar Impulse 2 is flown by André Borschberg from Lehigh Valley International Airport in Hanover Township, Pennsylvania, to John F. Kennedy International Airport in New York City, completing the 14th leg of its  solar-powered circumnavigation without using fossil fuels.

12 June
A man throws a homemade explosive device made from a beer bottle at the Terminal 2 check-in ticketing counter at Shanghai Pudong International Airport at Shanghai, China which explodes, injuring four with flying glass. He then slashes his own throat with a knife, injuring himself seriously.
An unauthorized unmanned aerial vehicle flying near Dubai International Airport in the United Arab Emirates, closed the airport for 69 minutes.
Airstrikes ascribed to Russian aircraft hit Syria's Idlib Governorate, including one attack on a market which kills at least 21 people, and another  in Maarrat al-Nu'man kills six in an apartment building.

12–13 June (overnight)
An airstrike on a ground vehicle in Yemen's Shabwa Governorate kills three al-Qaeda members in the vehicle. The strike is suspected of having been conducted by a U.S. unmanned aerial vehicle.

13 June
The U.S. FAA charged Amazon with shipping hazardous materials as air cargo, without training employees to handle it, or declaring, packaging, or labelling it properly, and that drain cleaner leaked at a United Parcel Service facility affecting nine workers. The FAA alleged they violated hazardous materials regulations on 24 occasions between February 2013 and September 2015 and demanded a fine of $350,000.

14 June
The U.S. Federal Aviation Administration (FAA) asked pilots in to avoid flying near walrus haul-out sites along the Chukchi Sea in Alaska as aircraft were frightening walruses into stampeding, and injuring or killing one another and nearby humans. Although the FAA does not plan formal  restrictions around the sites, harassing walrusesremains illegal under the U.S. Marine Mammal Protection Act of 1972.

15 June
The Government of Egypt announces the discovery and imaging of the wreckage of EgyptAir Flight 804 Airbus A320-232 in the Mediterranean which crashed on 19 May 2016, killing all 66 on board.
After successfully launching a satellite into orbit, an engine fails on the first stage of SpaceX's Falcon 9 rocket, causing it to descend too quickly toward the floating platform on which it was to land and resulted in what Musk termed its "rapid unscheduled disassembly." Musk adds that corrections for the problem could be ready by late 2016.

16 June

17 June
Two Japan Air Self-Defense Force fighters intercept two Chinese fighters over the East China Sea near the Senkaku Islands. In July, the People's Republic of China criticized the Japanese pilots during the encounter.
Syrian Arab Air Force strikes on rebel targets in Aleppo, Syria, in the evening kill between 7 and 9 people and according to Doctors Without Borders, and puts Aleppo's largest hospital out of service.
The Syrian Observatory for Human Rights releases images suggesting the Russian's used cluster bombs against U.S.-backed Syrian rebels near Al-Tanf, Syria, earlier in the week that killed two and wounded four. The images show what appears to be the tail section of a Russian RBK-500 cluster bomb.
They were badly damaged prior to recovery and required repairs before data could be processed.
National Aeronautics and Space Administration Administrator Charles Bolden announces plans for the X-57 Maxwell, a 14-motor, all-electric airplane at an American Institute of Aeronautics and Astronautics conference in Washington, D.C., to spur the development of more energy-efficient and cleaner general aviation aircraft.

18 June
The day after the Iraqi government declared victory in Fallujah, the Iraqi Army commander Lieutenant General Abdelwahab al-Saedi tells the press, while touring Fallujah, that most of the 300 to 700 Islamic State people in the city when the operation began were killed by U.S.-led coalition airstrikes.
A U.S. Department of Defense spokesman announced that during a video teleconference they "expressed strong concerns" to the Russian Miniistry of Defense about using cluster bombs in Syria earlier that week.

19 June
Aircraft supporting a Syrian government ground offensive against Islamic State forces holding Tabqa air base strike the nearby city of Al-Thawrah, Syria, with cluster munitions, reportedly killed 10 people.
During a parachute failure test, the Blue Origin New Shepard reusable space launch system lands intact in West Texas, its fourth suborbital flight. During the unmanned flight, the capsule and rocket separated and controllers tested if the capsule can land safely with a parachute failure. Using wings and firing its engine to slow its descent, the rocket lands about seven minutes before the capsule. Both landings are successful.
The Terrafugia Transition roadable airplane receives exemptions from the U.S. Federal Aviation Administration as a "light sport aircraft." The administrative action opens the possibility of a flying car for consumer use for the first time. Provided that their roadable aircraft overcomes regulatory barriers, the manufacturers said they could enter the consumer market in the next decade.

20 June
Solar Impulse 2 is flown by Bertrand Piccard from John F. Kennedy International Airport in New York City to Seville Airport in Seville, Spain on the 15th leg of its solar-powered  circumnavigation. This leg will cover  and take at least 90 hours.

21 June
After a 10-hour flight from Rothera Research Station on the Antarctic Peninsula, a Canadian Kenn Borek Air de Havilland Canada DHC-6 Twin Otter lands at Amundsen–Scott South Pole Station, at the Geographic South Pole in Antarctica to evacuate two workers who had fallen ill. It is only the third flight there during the Antarctic winter in the 60 years since the station opened in 1956 and normally, no flights occur from February to October each year. The airplane returned to the Rothera station the following day with the patients.
The FAA expects 2.5 million UAVs to be sold to hobbyists in the United States during 2016 and 7 million in 2020. U.S. commercial UAV operators must be vetted by the U.S. Transportation Security Administration and pass an aeronautical knowledge examination at an FAA-approved test center, but do not address over-the-horizon operations by commercial UAVs. The FAA reports that there are 10,602 registered commercial UAVs in the United States and projects that 600,000 UAVs intended for commercial use will be sold in the United States during 2016 and that 2.7 million will be sold for commercial use in 2020.
Boeing announced a tentative agreement for Iran Air to buy Boeing 737s and Boeing 777s airliners to replace its pre-1979 Boeings in the first major U.S. trade deal in Iran following the 2015 Iran-United States nuclear accord. It still faces political and regulatory hurdles, but the first new airliners could be in Iran in October 2016. The deal could be worth $25 billion, depending on how many are new or leased.

22 June
The Australian Transport Safety Bureau announced that the debris found in the Indian Ocean off Kangaroo Island off the coast of South Australia on 9 June is not from Malaysian Airlines Flight 370.

23 June
Airstrikes combined with mortar attacks kill eight people in Aleppo, Syria.
Solar Impulse 2 lands at Seville Airport in Seville, Spain, completing the 15th leg of its solar-powered circumnaviation without using any fossil fuel.
An Air Serbia Airbus A330 lands at John F. Kennedy International Airport in New York City after a nonstop flight from Belgrade, Serbia, inaugurating their first transatlantic route and Serbia's first nonstop service to the United States since Jat Airways, the Socialist Federal Republic of Yugoslavia's national airline discontinued the route in 1992.
Aeroméxico was the third airline announcing the suspension of service to Caracas, Venezuela, whose currency controls make it difficult to convert ticket sales revenue to United States dollars to cover operating costs.

24 June
A U.S. Department of Defense spokesman announced U.S. airstrikes against the Taliban in southern Afghanistan during the previous week. The strikes follow a decision by President Barack Obama earlier in June to expand U.S. airstrikes in Afghanistan to assist Afghan forces during offensive operations.

25 June
Airstrikes reportedly made by Russian airplanes kill 30 to 46 people in the Islamic State-held town of Qourieh in Syria's Deir ez-Zor Governorate.

26 June
A National Army of Colombia Mil Mi-17 helicopter crashes in the mountains in Caldas Department in central Colombia, killing all 17 on board and the wreck is not found until the following day.

27 June
Turkish president Recep Tayyip Erdoğan sends a written apology to Russian president Vladimir Putin for a Turkish Air Force's downing of a Russian Air Force aircraft over Syria in November 2015.

28 June
A three-person suicide team with Kalashnikov rifles and suicide bombs blew themselves up in the arrival and departure areas and in a nearby parking lot at the Istanbul Atatürk Airport international terminal in Turkey, killing at least 44 and injuring more than 230. Flight operations were temporarily suspended, and the U.S. Federal Aviation Administration temporarily grounds all flights to and from Istanbul.

29 June
Iran announced the suspension of commercial flights to Istanbul Atatürk Airport.
After a nonstop transatlantic flight from Marine Corps Air Station Beaufort, South Carolina, a Royal Air Force Lockheed Martin F-35B Lightning II aircraft arrived at RAF Fairford in the United Kingdom, making the first F-35  in the United Kingdom.

29–30 June (overnight)
U.S., British and Iraqi airplanes and attack helicopters attacked two large convoys of ground vehicles fleeing Fallujah, Iraq. The strikes destroyed at least 150 vehicles and kill about 250 people but the Iraqi armed forces said that the strikes destroyed 798 vehicles including eight car bombs and kill hundreds of Islamic State combat personnel, with the U.S.-led coalition responsible for 117 of the vehicles and three of the car bombs and Iraqi aircraft destroying the rest. A U.S.-led coalition spokesman said coalition aircraft avoiding attacking portions of the convoys it thought included civilians. U.S. aircraft in the attack were diverted from supporting Syrian rebel forces attempting to capture Bukamal, Syria, which lacking air support, were defeated.

30 June
United States Secretary of Defense Ashton Carter announced that earlier in the week the United States offered intelligence to Russia to improve Russian targeting of terrorist groups in Syria if Russia agreed to stop attacks on civilians and those rebel groups that agreed to a ceasefire, and to use its influence with the Syrian Government to get Bashar al-Assad to join the ceasefire. The United States offer excluded joint military planning, joint targeting, or coordination of Russian and U.S. airstrikes or other U.S. operations in Syria.
U.S. Air Force F-35 Lightning II aircraft deploy outside the United States for the first time when three F-35A aircraft of the 56th Fighter Wing land  in the United Kingdom.

July
Tunisair inaugurates its first transatlantic service, operating between Tunis and Montreal.

1 July
A U.S. airstrike in southern Yemen kills two  Al-Qaeda members.
A Syrian Arab Air Force fighter crashed near Jeiroud in a rebel-held part of Syria during what the Syrian Government claims was a training flight. Rebels capture its pilot and kill him.
A Russian Ministry of Emergency Situations Ilyushin Il-76 aerial firefighting airplane crashed near Lake Baikal while fighting a forest fire, killing all 10 on board. The wreck was found on 3 July.
The Obama administration released a report claiming that between 2009 and the end of 2015 the Central Intelligence Agency and the United States armed forces carried out 473 airstrikes with UAVs in countries where the United States was not at war, killing between 2,372 and 2,581 "combatants" and inadvertently killing between 64 and 116 civilians. Not named in the report, but this includes Libya, Pakistan, Somalia, and Yemen. This excludes deaths in Afghanistan, Iraq, and Syria, where the U.S. is at war. Critics say it under-reports civilian deaths, which the Long War Journal puts at 212, the New America Foundation estimates 219, and the Bureau of Investigative Journalism counts at least 325.

2 July
Israeli aircraft attack four Hamas training sites in the Gaza Strip, damaging buildings but harming no one. The strike is in response to a rocket attack against Israel from the Gaza Strip the previous day that damaged an empty kindergarten building without killing or injuring anyone.
Airstrikes against rebel-held Jeiroud, Syria – suspected of being Syrian government strikes conducted in retaliation for the killing of a captured Syrian Arab Air Force pilot by rebels in the area the previous day – kill at least 25 people. One report puts the death toll at 31, and another says seven medical personnel were killed in at least 40 air attacks against the town.

3 July
U.S.-led coalition Airstrikes  support a U.S.-backed Syrian rebel offensive against Islamic State positions near Manbij, Syria, but the attack is repelled.

4 July
China protests "provocative actions" by two Japan Air Self-Defense Force fighters on 17 June intercepting two Chinese fighters over the East China Sea near the Japanese-controlled Senkaku Islands (called the Diaoyu Islands in China), saying that the Chinese fighters were on a routine patrol when the Japanese aircraft locked onto them with fire control radar and adding that the Chinese planes took "tactical measures" before the Japanese aircraft left.
A U.S. airstrike in Yemen's Shabwa Governorate kills two members of Al-Qaeda in the Arabian Peninsula.

5 July
Japan denies that its aircraft engaged in provocative or dangerous activities while intercepting Chinese fighters over the East China Sea on 17 June, adding that its aircraft intercepted Chinese military aircraft about 200 times between 1 April and 30 June 2016, up from about 80 times during the same period in 2015.

7 July
The United States Department of Transportation announced that it has tentatively awarded eight U.S. airlines out of 12 that applied nonstop flights between the United States and Havana, Cuba, with the awards to be finalized at the end of July and service to begin during the autumn of 2016. The flights are: Alaska Airlines from Los Angeles, California, American Airlines from Miami, Florida, and Charlotte, North Carolina, Delta from Atlanta, Georgia, Miami, and New York City, Frontier Airlines from Miami; JetBlue from Fort Lauderdale and Orlando, Florida, and John F. Kennedy International, Southwest from Fort Lauderdale and Tampa, Florida,  Spirit Airlines from Fort Lauderdale, and United Airlines from Newark, New Jersey, and Houston, Texas. The flights will provide the first scheduled commercial air service between the United States and Havana since the early 1960s. Among rejected routes is a proposed United Airlines service from Washington, D.C.

8 July
On the last day of a widely violated three-day Syrian Arab Army ceasefire, jets from either the Syrian Arab Air Force or the Russian Federation Air Force attacked Darkush, Syria, a vacation spot during the Eid al-Fitr holiday weekend, killing at least 23.
Islamic State forces down a helicopter near Palmyra, Syria, killing two Russians. Russia says it was a Syrian Mil Mi-25 on a training mission when they were diverted against an Islamic State ground attack, which they thwarted before being downed by a U.S.-made BGM-71 TOW missile. However independent experts said the downed helicopter was a Russian armed forces Mil Mi-35M attack helicopter on a combat mission, and was very unlikely to have been downed with a BGM-71.

9 July
A U.S. air-to-ground missile attack from an unmanned aerial vehicle in Afghanistan targeting members of the Islamic State-Khorasan Province group killed five Islamists including Umar Narai, also known as Khalifa Umar Mansoor, the leader of the Tariq Gidar Group behind the 2014 Peshawar school massacre.
U.S.-led coalition airstrikes helped Iraqi ground forces recapture Qayyarah Air Base in Mosul District in the Nineveh Governorate in Iraq, from the Islamic State. The Iraqi counterterrorism forces commander credits coalition airstrikes with destroying 60 Islamic State car bombs.
The United Nations begins a humanitarian aid airlift using a World Food Programme chartered airplane to an estimated 275,000 people in Syria's Al-Hasakah Governorate cut off from food and other supplies for six months. The first flight delivered  of food, to Kamishly Airport in Qamishli.

10 July
Syrian government air raids against a neighborhood in Aleppo and a diesel market in Turmanin reportedly kills 10 people, while the air raids on Turmanin destroy several tanker trucks and kill between eight and 14 people.
At the Farnborough International Airshow Boeing said they saw strong interest in a new mid-range airliner seating between 200 and 270, creating a new, larger market beyond that of the Boeing 757 and Airbus A321neo. It would cost $10 to $15 billion to develop and be the company's biggest potential product development over the next decade.

11 July
Solar Impulse 2 was flown by André Borschberg from Seville Airport in Spain to Cairo International Airport in Egypt, beginning the 16th leg of its solar-powered circumnavigation. They planned for a two-day flight to pass over the Mediterranean, Tunisia, Algeria, Malta, Italy, and Greece.
A Portuguese Air Force Lockheed C-130 Hercules transport crashed just after takeoff from Montijo Air Base in Portugal, killing the three-man crew.

12 July
Fedor Konyukhov departed Northam, Western Australia, for a solo circumnavigation in a hot-air balloon that he completes on 23 July.
After nearly 45 years, the U.S. Federal Bureau of Investigation announced it closed its investigation of the 24 November 1971 hijacking of Northwest Airlines Flight 305 by a man who identified himself as Dan Cooper, who the press misidentified "D. B. Cooper," and who parachuted from the airliner with a $200,000 ransom, and disappeared. It is the only unsolved American aircraft hijacking case.

13 July
The day after the Permanent Court of Arbitration ruled against the People's Republic of China in Philippines vs. China regarding a territorial disputein the South China Sea, two Chinese civilian aircraft fly to Chinese-claimed islands, one each landing at Mischief Reef and Subi Reef. Both departing later in the day.
An airstrike on a market in Ariha, Syria, kills between nine and 12 people. Another airstrike on a market in Al-Rastan, Syria, reportedly kills 16 people and wounds dozens.
Solar Impulse 2 lands at Cairo International Airport in Egypt, completing the 16th leg of its solar-powered circumnavigation.
At a NATO-Russia Council meeting, Russian diplomats propose to North Atlantic Treaty Organization (NATO) that aircraft over the Baltic use transponders to improve safety. Although aircraft under NATO command are required to use transponders, NATO member country aircraft don't always use them when not under NATO control, and Russian aircraft also fly with them off. NATO representatives welcome the proposal and promise to study it.
President of France François Hollande announced the French Navy aircraft carrier Charles de Gaulle will deploy against the Islamic State in retaliation for attacks in France in January 2015 and November 2015.

14 July
Airstrikes on rebel-held districts of Aleppo, Syria, reportedly kill 12 people.
The Islamic State reportedly shot down a Syrian Arab Air Force jet near the military airport at Deir ez-Zor, Syria, killing its pilot, and a video they released purportedly shows the pilot's body which the Syrian Observatory for Human Rights reports had been crucified.
United States Secretary of State John Kerry met with President of Russia Vladimir Putin in Moscow over a U.S. proposal supported by United Nations officials to integrate U.S. and Russian operations against the Islamic State and Jabhat al-Nusra in Syria and to halt Syrian government and Russian attacks on civilians and moderate Syrian rebel forces that signed a February 2016 ceasefire agreement. The proposal seeks Russian pressure on the Syrian government to ground military aircraft and restrict Russian attacks to Islamic State and Jabhat al-Nusra targets, and for previously rare U.S. attacks on Jabhat al-Nusra to increase along with strikes against Islamic State targets in Syria. They would share intelligence and planning for leadership targets, headquarters, camps, depots, and supply lines, with other targets off-limits to both countries, with a liaison body to assist in compliance, and to go into effect by 31 July. The following day, the two countries announced that they had reached an agreement, but no details were made public.
Airbus and Boeing have their lowest airliner sales at the Farnborough Air Show in six years, with deals for about 400 aircraft worth about $50 billion, half of the previous year's sales. American, European, and Persian Gulf carriers made almost no deals, and only Asian carriers made large orders. No orders are made for the Boeing 777, Airbus A330neo, or Bombardier C-Series, and Airbus A380 production was greatly reduced. Industry analysts blame reduced sales on uncertainty over the global economy and on the United Kingdom's 23 June 2016 vote to leave the European Union.

15–16 July (overnight)
A group of military officers in Turkey attempt a coup d'état against the government of President Recep Tayyip Erdoğan. Esenboğa International Airport in Ankara closes. In Gölbaşı, just outside Ankara, pro-coup helicopters attacked police special forces headquarters, police air force headquarters, and the Türksat headquarters, leaving 42 dead and 43 injured. Pro-coup helicopters also attacked the parliament building in Ankara and the Turkish government declares a no-fly zone over the city and a Turkish Air Force F-16 Fighting Falcon downs a pro-coup helicopter nearby. In Istanbul, pro-coup military forces occupied Istanbul Atatürk Airport, forcing all flights to be cancelled. In Marmaris, two or three helicopters attacked a hotel where Erdoğan had been vacationing and discharge troops who kill two and injure eight police. Authorities closed access and cut power to Incirlik Air Base, from which United States Air Force aircraft with the American-led intervention in Syria were based, but normal operations resumed within 24 hours. The coup soon fizzled, and one Turkish Black Hawk helicopter, escorted by Hellenic Air Force F-16s, landed at Alexandroupoli Airport in Greece, where authorities arrested the eight for an illegal landing, who then requested political asylum. The helicopter was returned to Turkey on 17 July.

17 July
According to Syrian rebels, the Syrian military attacks the village of al-Shajara, Syria on the border with Jordan, held by Shuhada al-Yarmouk, group thought to be aligned with al-Qaeda.
A Libyan Islamist militia fighting the United Nations-backed Government of Libya downed a French helicopter in Libya, killing three French soldiers. On 20 July the Government of France made its first public admission that French special forces were in Libya, and President of France François Hollande stated that they were conducting "dangerous intelligence operations".
A pilot is killed after crashing a North American T-28 Trojan at an airshow in Cold Lake, Alberta, Canada.

18 July
Airstrikes against Islamic State areas in Syria by the U.S.-led coalition killed 15 people in Manbij and six in nearby Tokhar. The United States announced that during the day the coalition conducted 18 airstrikes, destroying 13 Islamic State fighting positions, two car bombs, and seven other Islamic State vehicles.
The pilot and copilot of Air Transat Flight 725 Airbus A310, are arrested at Glasgow Airport in Scotland for being drunk as they prepare to fly to Toronto, Ontario in Canada. The airline suspends them the next day.
After launching a Dragon spacecraft, the first stage of a SpaceX Falcon 9 rocket returned to a soft landing at the Kennedy Space Center in Cape Canaveral, Florida, landing about eight minutes after liftoff. It was the second successful landing by a Falcon 9 first stage on land.
The Obama administration agreed to pay 2.6 million euros to relatives of Italian aid worker Giovanni Lo Porto who was killed in a Central Intelligence Agency unmanned aerial vehicle attack in Pakistan in January 2015. On 16 September 2016, the United States government confirmed the settlement publicly.

19 July
The U.S.-led coalition attacked Islamic State-held territory in northern Syria against an offensive against the U.S.-backed Syrian Democratic Forces (SDF). The Syrian Observatory for Human Rights stated 56 civilians died, but other reports put the toll as high as 212. The Islamic State said 160 civilians were killed in Tokhar, and the Syrian Ministry of Foreign Affairs and Expatriates said French aircraft attacked Tokhar killed 120 civilians. The SDF disputes this, saying that the strikes killed Islamic State personnel that were being tallied as civilian deaths. The U.S. military announces that its aircraft made 18 attacks in the Manbij area in the previous 24 hours – out of 450 in the area since May and is investigating allegations of civilian casualties. In late August, United States Central Command said the Tokhar strike conducted by U.S. Air Force A-10 Thunderbolt II and B-52H Stratofortress aircraft using  laser-guided bombs against a mortar killed 85 militants and 10 civilians, but Syrian activists said that all or most of the 95 dead were civilians. 
Since the U.S.-led coalition's air campaign in Iraq and Syria against the Islamic State began in August 2014, U.S. aircraft made over 10,500 attacks while the rest of the coalition combined made 3,200.
20 July
A network router fails in Southwest Airlines' computer system and back-up systems fail to activate, causing a 12-hour outage that cripples the airline's flight operations throughout the United States. Normal operations do not resume fully until 24 July, during which time Southwest cancelled about 2,300 of approximately 19,500 scheduled flights.

22 July
An Indian Air Force Antonov An-32 with 29 people on board disappears over the Bay of Bengal during a flight from Tambaram, India, to Port Blair in the Andaman Islands.

23 July
Fedor Konyukhov lands near Bonnie Rock, Western Australia after 11 days, setting a record for the fastest circumnavigation in a hot-air balloon and becoming the second person after Steve Fossett in 2002 to solo a balloon around the world.

23–24 July (overnight)
Syrian government airstrikes hit five medical clinics in Syria's Aleppo Governorate. Four were in Aleppo and one in Atarib, along with and a blood bank in Aleppo, killing at least five people.

24 July
 Solar Impulse 2 was flown from Cairo International Airport in Egypt by Bertrand Piccard, for the 17th and final leg of its solar-powered circumnavigation. Plans called for a two-day nonstop solo flight to Al Bateen Executive Airport in the United Arab Emirates, where the journey began on 9 March 2015.

25 July
The U.S. Environmental Protection Agency issued an "endangerment finding", a scientific assessment describing a danger to the environment that determines that emissions from airplane engines including carbon dioxide, methane, and nitrous oxide pose health risks and contribute to climate change. It is the first step in a years-long process toward commercial aircraft engine emission regulations by the United States government.

26 July
A U.S. unmanned aerial vehicle-launched air-to-ground missile strike in Afghanistan's Nangarhar Province kills the Islamic State leader Hafiz Saeed Khan which the United States Department of Defense announced on 12 August.
Solar Impulse 2 becomes the first solar-powered aircraft to circumnavigate the world and the first to do so without using any fossil fuel.

28 July
Syrian Arab Air Force aircraft drop leaflets on Aleppo, Syria, informing residents that the Government of Syria will allow them to depart the city via three safe corridors while rebel soldiers wishing stop fight would be granted safe passage through a fourth corridor.

29 July 
According to the International Air Transport Association, Venezuelan commercial air traffic dropped 30% since the Venezuelan bolívar began falling in 2013. International air carriers accumulated about $4 billion in bolívars which Venezuela banned from being converted into hard currency, prompting various airlines including Aeroméxico, Air Canada, Alitalia, LATAM, and Lufthansa to suspend service, and others to reduce capacity. Only Venezuelan airlines can buy fuel with bolívars, while other carriers must pay in United States dollars. Simón Bolívar International Airport in Caracas, long a major hub for airlines serving South America, has been replaced by El Dorado International Airport in Bogotá, Colombia and Jorge Chávez International Airport in Peru. 
A Piper PA-31 Navajo medical transport crashes in northern California and all four occupants die.

30 July
A hot-air balloon operated by Heart of Texas Hot Air Balloon Rides caught fire and crashed in a field in Maxwell, Texas, killing all 16 people on board in the deadliest ballooning accident in U.S. history and second-deadliest in world history, exceeded only by a Luxor crash in Egypt in February 2013 that killed 19.
Skydiver Luke Aikins became the first to jump from an airplane into a net on the ground without a parachute.

31 July
Responding to attempts to break the siege of Aleppo, Syrian government helicopters bomb the rebel-held neighborhood of Bustan al-Basha. Later that day, Russian Federation Air Force or Syrian Arab Air Force jets bomb the eastern part of the city. Residents burn tires to create black smoke to reduce visibility against attacking aircraft.

August
Delta complained to the U.S. General Services Administration in August that JetBlue's use of foreign codeshare partners on government contract routes violated the Fly America Act which requires those flying on official business paid for by the U.S. government to use U.S. carriers. Delta, American Airlines and United claimed to be at a disadvantage against codeshare partner subsidies, but the GSA argued otherwise.

1 August
The Government of Singapore restructures its Air Accident Investigation Bureau to establish the Transport Safety Investigation Bureau as an independent agency responsible for investigating aviation and marine accidents and incidents in Singapore.
Syrian rebels shoot down a Russian Mil Mi-8 helicopter in Syria's Idlib Governorate during fighting around Aleppo, Syria, killing all five on board. Russia claims the helicopter had been carrying humanitarian goods to Aleppo.
At the request of Libya's Government of National Accord (GNA), U.S. manned and unmanned aircraft made two strikes against Islamic State forces in Sirte, Libya, destroying a tank and two other vehicles. They are the first strikes requested by the GNA and the first direct U.S. military intervention in the Libyan Civil War. President Barack Obama approved these strikes, but United States Africa Command commander General Thomas D. Waldhausen is authorized to approve future strikes.

2 August
IndiGo Flights 6E-813 and 6E-136, each with at least 100 people on board, narrowly avert a mid-air collision over Guwahati, India, when Flight 6E-813 makes a steep dive to avoid Flight 6E-136 coming from the opposite direction, but six people are injured.
Syrian or Russian airstrikes killed 11 people in Atarib, Syria. Residents of Aleppo, Syria, burned tires to create black smoke to interfere with airstrikes.
The United States Air Force announced that its first F-35A Lightning II squadron, the 34th Fighter Squadron at Hill Air Force Base, Utah is operational. The United States Marine Corps's F-35B variant had previously been declared operational.

3 August
After air traffic control at Dubai International Airport in the United Arab Emirates, instructed Emirates Flight 521 Boeing 777-31H from Thiruvananthapuram, India to abort its landing, the airliner crashed on the runway. All 300 occupants evacuated with 14 injured while the airplane is destroyed by fire and explosions, killing a firefighter. It is the airline's first hull loss and most serious accident. The airport is closed for  hours, and incoming flights are diverted, causing widespread disruption in the area.

4 August
A Pakistani helicopter carrying seven civil engineers from Pakistan to Russia crashed in Afghanistan where the Taliban took them hostage leading the Pakistan Army request U.S. assistance in their recovery.
Amazon unveiled Prime One, the first of 11 being flown, of an eventual 40 leased Boeing 767 cargo airplanes to be branded as "Prime Air," for carrying Amazon Prime customer goods. Prime One is the first in Prime Air livery. Its tail number, N1997A, was highlighted in a marketing gimmick as 1997 is a prime number. Amazon will bring the remaining aircraft into service over the next several years.

5 August
ASL Airlines Hungary Flight 7332 Boeing 737-476SF cargo aircraft slid off a runway at Il Caravaggio International Airport in  Italy while landing in bad weather conditions. It crashed through a perimeter fence onto a highway, narrowly avoiding oncoming cars but destroying several in an adjacent parking lot. Neither crew members are injured. The airport closed for three hours, and flights diverted to Milan, Italy.
Black Lives Matter protesters temporarily block a road into Heathrow Airport outside London.
A declassified, redacted copy of the Obama administration's May 2013 Presidential Policy Guidance on UAV airstrike guidelines is released to the American Civil Liberties Union after a July 2016 court order. It requires that a target be a "continuing and imminent" threat to Americans, that capture is not feasible, there is "near certainty" of their location, that no civilians be injured or killed, and that relevant domestic and international laws be obeyed.

6 August
China's People's Liberation Army Air Force announced it conducted combat air patrols over disputed areas in the South China Sea including the Spratly Islands, Scarborough Shoal, and nearby areas, "to enhance combat capabilities to deal with various security threats" and to protect China's sovereignty and maritime interests. It did not say when the flights occurred. After a 12 July 2016 Permanent Court of Arbitration ruling against its South China Sea claim, it also announced it made such flights and they would be "regular practice."
Unidentified aircraft destroy a Doctors Without Borders hospital in Millis, Syria, in the Idlib Governorate, killing 13 and injuring at least six. The United States Department of Defense claimed that U.S. aircraft made no airstrikes near there.

8 August
Delta's computer problems forced it to canceled 2,300 flights over three days, delaying tens of thousands of passengers and cost Delta $100 million in revenue.

9 August
The Saudi-led coalition resumed airstrikes in Yemen following a Yemeni Civil War ceasefire that began on 11 April. They attack a potato processing plant in a Yemeni Army camp in Sana'a, killing 14 to 16 people and at least 10 others are injured.

10 August
According to Syrian activists, Syrian government helicopters dropped barrel bombs on rebel-held areas of Aleppo, Syria, killing at least two people. Activists claimed that one of the barrel bombs contained chlorine gas, while the Syrian government denied it used chemical weapons. On 13 August, the Syrian American Medical Society claimed that a bomb dropped by a jet also contained chlorine gas, which killed three people.
An Iraqi Air Force helicopter crashed in Iraq's Maysan Governorate during an emergency landing after a malfunction, injuring all nine occupants.

11 August
Russian Federation Air Force attacks on Islamic State-held Raqqa in Syria killed 20 to 24 civilians and six others who may or may not have been civilians.
Turkish Minister of Foreign Affairs Mevlüt Çavuşoğlu announced that Turkish Air Force airstrikes will resume against the Islamic State with the U.S.-led coalition and suggested joint operations with Russia. Turkey paused operations after downing a Russian aircraft in November 2015 which strained their relationship.

12 August
Syrian Arab Air Force or Russian Federation Air Force airstrikes in and around Aleppo, Syria, kill at least 20 people, including four at the only hospital for women and children in Kafr Hamrah, six at a market in Urum al-Kubra, and 10 in the village of Hayan.
A man with no formal flight training stole a Piper PA-38 Tomahawk at Markham Airport in Ontario, Canada, before dying in a crash nearby, raising concerns about security at private airports, while the Royal Canadian Mounted Police investigated whether it was a "national security issue."

13 August
A Taliban offensive against Lashkar Gah was thwarted by U.S. air support defending Afghan forces.
A Royal Saudi Air Force airstrike on a school in Sa'dah killed 10 children and injured 28. Local reports have the children taking exams at the time, while a Saudi coalition spokesman claimed the children were rebel recruits at a training camp.

14 August
U.S.-led coalition aircraft supported an offensive by Kurdish peshmerga troops in Iraq east of Mosul that captured five villages, and destroyed a car bomb.
Saudi-led coalition aircraft support a pro-government offensive in Yemen against al-Qaeda forces that captured Zinjibar and Jaʿār, which killed more than 40 Islamic militants and destroyed several vehicles.
Boko Haram released a video in which a girl the group kidnapped in 2014 alleges Nigerian Air Force attacks against Boko Haram killed some of the other girls, while showing the bodies of the kidnapped schoolgirls.
Reports 45 minutes apart of shots fired in two different terminals at John F. Kennedy International Airport in Queens, New York led to thousands of people being evacuated, and air traffic is grounded. Police found that television coverage of Jamaican sprinter Usain Bolt competing in the 100-metre dash in the Olympics had been misinterpreted.

15 August
A Saudi-led coalition airstrike on a Doctors Without Borders hospital in Yemen, killed 19 and injured 24. It is at least the fourth attack on a Doctors Without Borders hospital since the Yemeni Civil War began in March 2015 by the coalition.
Six people were killed in a light airplane crash in Alabama, United States.

16 August
Russian Tupolev Tu-22M bombers attack the Islamic State and Jabhat Fateh al-Sham in Syria from near Hamadan in Iran, the first time Russia's attacks on Syria were made from Iran. The U.S. military  is informed of the mission in advance as per the agreement to deconflict Syrian air operations. The Iranians confirmed the Russians used an Iranian base the next day, but claim it was only to refuel.
Syrian activists reported an airstrike against a field hospital in Syria's Aleppo Governorate that injured one person just after the hospital had been evacuated.
Air Djibouti relaunches flight operations, using a Boeing 737-400. It is the first time the airline has flown since 2002.

17 August
Syrian Arab Air Force Sukhoi Su-24 aircraft make their first airstrikes against Kurdish People's Protection Units (YPG) in Syria's Hasakah Governorate, killing several Kurds. Bombs land near U.S. and coalition special operations forces working with the YPG but cause no casualties among them. Coalition ground forces cannot contact the Syrian jets, and U.S. fighters arrive as the Syrians depart. The U.S.-led coalition increased combat air patrols and warned the Syrian government away from coalition ground forces.
The Hybrid Air Vehicles  Airlander 10 hybrid airship made its first  flight, of 30 minutes, at Cardington Airfield in England.

18 August
Doctors Without Borders announced the evacuation of its staff from six hospitals in northern Yemen, due to continued "indiscriminate" Saudi-led coalition attacks and "unreliable" assurances from high-ranking coalition officials, even after it provided hospital GPS coordinates.

19 August
Two Syrian Arab Air Force Sukhoi Su-24 aircraft near Hasakah, Syria, where Syrian aircraft had bombed U.S. and coalition special operations forces on the ground were intercepted by  U.S.-led coalition fighters and according to a U.S. Department of Defense spokesman, "encouraged" to leave the area "without further incident."

21 August
In retaliation for a Gaza Strip rocket that landed in Sderot, Israel, Israeli aircraft and tanks claim to have attacked at least 30 Hamas, Islamic Jihad Movement in Palestine, and other militant group targets in the Gaza Strip, while injuring two people.
United States Army Lieutenant General Stephen J. Townsend, the new commander of Combined Joint Task Force – Operation Inherent Resolve which is responsible for operations against the Islamic State, announced that U.S. and allied forces would increase attacks on the Islamic State to support offensives by Syrian rebel forces against Raqqa, Syria, and by Iraqi government forces against Mosul, Iraq.

22 August
A U.S. military spokesman in Kabul, Afghanistan, announced that Embraer A-29 Super Tucano light attack aircraft flown by Afghan pilots have deployed to Kunduz, Afghanistan, to operate against Taliban forces attempting to capture the city.
An Iranian Ministry of Foreign Affairs spokesman announced that Russian aircraft with no longer use bases in Iran, apparently due to the publicity and that Russian use of Hamadan Airbase was "temporary, based on a Russian request" and "finished for now." From 16 August, Russian Tupolev Tu-22M bombers, Sukhoi Su-34 strike aircraft and Sukhoi Su-30SM and Sukhoi Su-35S fighters made at least three attacks on Syria from Hamadan.

23 August
The Nigerian Army said in multiple announcements that a Nigerian Air Force's "most unprecedented and spectacular air raid" on 19 August had killed Boko Haram leader, Abubakar Shekau, the fourth time they have said so, along with three other top commanders and 300 Boko Haram personnel, as members of the group prayed in a Sambisa Forest village in Nigeria's Borno State. They later amended that to say he was injured. None of the reports were verified.

24 August
Turkish Air Force and U.S. aircraft support Free Syrian Army troops in capturing Jarabulus from the Islamic State.
The Israel Defense Forces (IDF) announced that they cleared their forces of wrongdoing in two airstrikes against targets in the Gaza Strip during the 2014 Israel–Gaza conflict. A 20 July 2014 airstrike that killed seven members of a family at the refugee camp in Bureij was justified as the house was also a Hamas military command-and-control center while three members of the family were Hamas members, and an airstrike on 1 August 2014 in Rafah that killed 15 family members was also was justified because the house was likewise a Hamas command-and-control center and that international law permits attacks on houses used for military purposes. The IDF also found that the deaths of 12 family members in Rafah on 21 July 2014 were from Palestinian mortar fire, not an Israeli airstrike.

26 August
The Russian government asked the Turkish government for information on its air operations over Syria. A Russian Ministry of Defense spokesman explained that they wished "to prevent air incidents because it will be the first time when Turkish warplanes will intensively bomb targets in Syria and [they] may meet Russian warplanes"

27 August
Syrian airplanes used a barrel bomb on a funeral in Al-Nayrab, Syria, then attacked again after rescue workers arrived, reportedly killing more than two dozen people.
The Turkish Air Force attacks Kurdish targets in Al-Amarna, Syria, south of Jarabulus.
While Southwest Airlines Flight 3472, a Boeing 737-700 was flying to Orlando, Florida from New Orleans, Louisiana the left nacelle exploded at altitude, damaging the fuselage and causing the cabin to lose air pressure. No-one is injured and an emergency landing was made at Pensacola, Florida.

28 August
Russia lifted its ban on charter flights to Turkey which were imposed after Turkey downed a Russian Sukhoi Su-24 near the Turkish/Syrian border in November 2015. On 29 August, the Association of Tour Operators of Russia executive director announced that charter flights will commence on 4–5 September.
Iranian state television airs video of a Russian-supplied mobile S-300 surface-to-air missile system deployed around the nuclear site at Fordo, Iran.
After police at Los Angeles International Airport in California, detained a man dressed as Zorro with a plastic sword, a report of shots fired caused a panic in which police evacuated terminals, people ran onto the airfield, and flights were halted. Harmless loud noises were found to be mistaken for shots, and Zorro is released to meet an arriving passenger.
Darrell Ward, a star in the reality television series Ice Road Truckers, and his pilot died when their Cessna 182 Skylane crashed on a highway while trying to land at Rock Creek, Montana, after flying from Missoula, Montana.

29 August
The first nationwide regulations for unmanned aerial vehicles went in effect in the United States. An FAA waiver is required to exceed these limits. They also require that UAV operators pass a written test for an FAA certification to operate UAVs. The FAA has received about 3,000 requests for certification, although UAV pilots still do not need a license. They do not apply to UAVs operated by hobbyists and do not address flights over private property, although the FAA recommends getting prior permission from property owners, and specific permission for taking photographs or video.

30 August
The Islamic State announces that its chief spokesman, Abu Mohammad al-Adnani, was killed in an airstrike. The U.S. Department of Defense reported that he was targeted in a "precision strike" in Al-Bab, Syria, with an AGM-114 Hellfire air-to-ground missile fired by an unmanned aerial vehicle but would not confirm his death. On 31 August, Russia claimed that an attack by a Sukhoi Su-34 killed as many as 40 Islamic State personnel on 30 August, including Adnani, but offered no evidence.
Joe Sutter, the chief engineer leading the 2,700 engineers who designed the Boeing 747 in the 1960s, died at the age of 95.

31 August
A Saudi-led coalition airstrike in Saada, Yemen killed at least 16 people, including an imam and 15 family members.
JetBlue Flight 387 Airbus A320 flying from Fort Lauderdale, Florida, to Santa Clara, Cuba is the first scheduled commercial flight between the two countries in over 50 years, and the first one made with a jet, as previous flights were made before jets had entered service on the route. United States Secretary of Transportation Anthony Foxx is a passenger.
The United States Department of Transportation announced that Alaska Airlines, American, Delta, JetBlue, Southwest, Spirit, and United will provide scheduled services to Havana, Cuba, and required services within 90 days. The airlines are to provide the service from Atlanta, Georgia, Charlotte, North Carolina, Fort Lauderdale, Miami, Orlando, and Tampa, in Florida, Houston, Texas, Los Angeles, California, New York City, and Newark.
A private Cessna hired by a woman to celebrate her boyfriend's birthday by seeing New Orleans, Louisiana, from the air crashes into Lake Pontchartrain after encountering a rainstorm. The boyfriend and the pilot died, but her boyfriend pushed her from the airplane before it sank, and a nearby boat rescued her from the lake.
A mid-air collision over a remote area near Russian Mission, Alaska, between a Hageland Aviation Cessna 208B Grand Caravan carrying three people and a Piper PA-18 Super Cub carrying two people kills everyone in both airplanes.

September
1 September
Suspected Syrian government airstrikes kill at least 25 civilians in Syria's Hama Governorate.

2 September
According to one report, it was a Syrian government helicopter from Russia or France, and two occupants were killed.

3 September
Iraqi Air Force fighter dropped leaflets on Shirqat and Zuwiyah in Iraq asking for support of Iraqi forces and their allies advancing into the area against the Islamic State.

4 September
A U.S. unmanned aerial vehicle fired an air-to-ground missile at an al Qaeda in the Arabian Peninsula gathering in Yemen's Shabwah Governorate, killing six people.
Syrian Arab Army forces supported by Russian  airstrikes encircled Aleppo, Syria, cutting the rebels off from reinforcements.

5 September
Since 3 September, U.S. aircraft conducted about 20 strikes against Islamic State targets in Iraq, centering on Nineveh Province and Mosul but also in Anbar Province, at least 25 strikes against Islamic State targets in northern and eastern Syria, at least 20 strikes against Islamic State targets in Sirte, Libya and several counterterrorism strikes in Afghanistan.
Two U.S. airstrikes against Al-Shabaab are made to defend African peacekeeping forces in Tortoroow, Somalia.

6 September
During a visit, President Barack Obama pledged an additional $90 million in aid to Laos toward cleaning up an estimated 80 million unexploded bombs remaining from the U.S.'s Vietnam War air campaign when the United States dropped around 270 million cluster bombs on Laos to cut Viet Cong and North Vietnamese Army supply lines.
A Syrian government aircraft drops a barrel bomb with chlorine gas on the rebel Sukkari neighborhood of Aleppo. According to Syrian Civil Defense, 120 people were hospitalized with breathing problems as a result. The next day, medical workers treated 70 people for breathing problems and two died on 7 September.
A Mexican police helicopter crashed in Mexico's Michoacán state during a police operation to capture leaders of criminal groups and drug cartels in Apatzingán, including the Knights Templar Cartel, killing three police officers and the pilot. Initial reports that the helicopter was shot down prompted an investigation into the cause of the crash.

7 September
A U.S. airstrike near Raqqa, Syria, killed Islamic State minister of information Wael Adel Salman al-Fayad, also known as Abu Mohamed Furqan. The United States Department of Defense announced the successful strike on 16 September.
A Syrian government airstrike in the rebel-held al-Sukkari neighborhood of Aleppo, Syria kills at least 10 civilians.

8 September
Afghan attack helicopters support Afghan ground troops opposing a Taliban ground offensive in street-to-street fighting in Tarinkot, Afghanistan.
Unidentified aircraft kill  Jabhat Fateh al-Sham commanders Abu Omar Saraqib and Abu Muslem al-Shami and kills or injures other senior group members in an evening airstrike in the village of Kafr Naha near Aleppo, Syria.
A Diamond DA20C with two occupants collided in mid-air with a Beech F-33A being flown solo near West Georgia Regional Airport in Carroll County, Georgia, killing all three.

10 September
Saudi-led coalition airstrikes on a well in Beit Sadaan, Yemen kill at least 30 people and wound at least 17, according to the United Nations, while Houthi rebels said that the strikes killed or wounded 100 people. Later strikes killed those who helped the wounded from earlier strikes.
A ceasefire is announced between the United States and Russia preceding a negotiated settlement to end the Syrian Civil War. A ceasefire between the Syrian government and opposition groups is to begin at sunset on 12 September. If it holds for seven days, the agreement calls for the protection of civilians from airstrikes, for the United States and Russia to coordinate airstrikes against Jabhat Fateh al-Sham and the Islamic State, and for the Syrian Arab Air Force to resume missions only over yet-to-be-selected areas with no rebel forces, among other terms.
Syrian Arab Air Force jets attack a market in Idlib, Syria, killing at least 36 people, and several neighborhoods in Aleppo, Syria, killing at least 45 people. The day's airstrikes killed over 100 people, all civilians, and injured more than 100.

11 September
To improve crowd control at the annual Hajj pilgrimage, and avoid a repeat of the 2015 Mina stampede that killed hundreds of people, Saudi authorities deployed unmanned aerial vehicles to monitor pilgrims ascending Mount Arafat, east of Mecca.

12 September
A ceasefire in the Syrian Civil War under an agreement between Russia and the United States went into effect at sundown, but is immediately violated. Among the violations is a barrel-bomb attack against a neighborhood of Aleppo by Syrian government helicopters.

14 September
Iraqi Air Force aircraft dropped leaflets on cities in Iraq's Nineveh Governorate to inform civilians of a planned offensive to retake Mosul from the Islamic State and asks civilians to stop fighting for the Islamic State, avoid Islamic State bases and help the anti-Islamic State coalition target the bases, and support advancing Iraqi troops and their allies.
Based on a United States Navy investigation into a fatal crash while the Blue Angels flight demonstration squadron practised for an air show on 2 June, the split S maneuver will be cancelled from their shows, dive recovery rules with airspeed limitations will be instituted, performances will be made at a higher altitude, and an altitude radio check will be performed at the start of each flight. The Blue Angels' training, maintenance and culture will undergo a safety review after the air show season ends, schedules will be adjusted to ensure adequate rest, and aerial maneuvers will be reviewed to improve safety.

16 September
The United States Air Force announced the grounding of 13 of its own F-35A Lightning IIs and two belonging to the Royal Norwegian Air Force due to fuel tank insulation problems which also affect 42 undelivered F-35As.
Bulgaria's national airline Bulgaria Air announced that it will make commercial flights to the United States for the first time since the 1990s, beginning in March 2017.

17 September
A U.S.-led coalition airstrike on Syrian Arab Army forces in Syria's Deir ez-Zor Governorate mistook them for Islamic State forces, killing 62, and wounding 100 before ceasing their attack when alerted to their error. It was the first such incident between U.S.-led coalition and Syrian forces. Russia called an emergency United Nations Security Council meeting  over concerns of U.S. support for the Islamic State, which would constitute a ceasefire violation. The United States expressed regret over the strike.

18 September
U.S.-led coalition airstrikes on a highway in Afghanistan's Urozgan Province near Tarinkot supporting Afghan forces against the Taliban  mistakenly killed eight Afghan police officers, and a second strike killed those helping the first strike's victims.
Syrian Arab Air Force or Russian Federation Air Force warplanes attacked rebel-held neighborhoods in eastern Aleppo, Syria, killing at least one person and injuring several others while another attack in Syria's Daraa Governorate killed eight.
Iranian state television announced a reduction in the number of airliners it would purchase from Airbus in January, from 118 to 112.

19 September
The Syrian government ended the ceasefire and the Syrian Arab Air Force made at least 35 attacks against rebel-held areas in and around Aleppo, Syria. One attack west of Aleppo was on a convoy unloading aid at a Syrian Arab Red Crescent warehouse which destroyed at least 18 of 31 trucks, and killed about 20 civilians, including at least 12 humanitarian aid workers, many of them truck drivers.
United States Secretary of the Air Force Deborah Lee James announced that a new bomber, the B-21 Raider is under development by Northrop Grumman for the U.S. Air Force's Long-Range Strike Bomber program. The B-21 is expected be operational in the mid-2020s.

20 September
Bulgaria Air confirms the lease of 14 new Boeing 737 aircraft to replace the Airbus A320s it operates in a deal valued at more than $8 billion.
A military helicopter belonging to the Libyan National Army crashes near Tobruk, killing all eight people on board, including the Libyan armed forces' commander-in-chief, Idris Younis.

21 September
After the Russian Ministry of Defense claims that a U.S. unmanned aerial vehicle was in the vicinity of the 19 September airstrike on a humanitarian aid convoy and warehouse outside Aleppo, Syria, and implies that it could have conducted the attack, the U.S. Department of Defense responds that no manned or unmanned aircraft of the U.S.-led coalition were in the area at the time. At the U.N. Security Council, U.S. Secretary of State John F. Kerry accuses Moscow of inventing its "own facts" to explain the air attack, which the United States had blamed on the Russian Federation Air Force, adding that "We don't get anywhere by ignoring facts and denying common sense;" he calls for Russia and Syria to "immediately ground all aircraft" flying in areas of northwest Syria where the convoy was hit.
The United States Government granted Airbus and Boeing licenses to sell airliners to Iran. Airbus's license covers the first 17 A320s and A330s that Iran agreed to purchase in a January. Airbus required U.S. Government permission because some components are manufactured in the United States. Boeing's license allows it to sell 80 and lease another 29 new Boeing 737s to Iran.

22 September
Syrian Arab Air Force or Russian aircraft attack rebel-held areas of Aleppo, Syria killing 21 in evening air raids on two Aleppo neighborhoods. 
At the U.N. Security Council, U.S. Secretary of State John F. Kerry repeats his 21 September call for Syria and Russia to ground aircraft in northeastern Syria, saying that "the only way" for the Syrian ceasefire to succeed is "if the ones who have the air power in this part of the conflict simply stop using it... . Absent a major gesture like this, we don't believe there is a point in making more promises, issuing more plans." 
The World Trade Organization (WTO) ruled that the European Union, France, Germany, Spain, and the United Kingdom failed to halt subsidies to Airbus after the WTO ordered them to stop in 2011, despite claiming in late 2011 that they had done so. The WTO claims subsidies of $22 billion over ten years cost the United States economy tens of billions of dollars and Boeing nearly 400 airliner sales in 2012 and 2013 alone. The ruling is a victory for the United States and its aerospace industry, which has disputed European aircraft subsidies for 40 years and complained to the WTO about it in 2004.

23 September
The Syrian government announced an offensive in and around Aleppo the previous evening. Their aircraft made more than 70 attacks and dropped at least 100 bombs in rebel-held areas of Aleppo, targeting Syrian Civil Defense centers, destroying two as well as damaging fire trucks and ambulances and at least 30 people in Aleppo died.

24 September
Syrian and Russian airstrikes in and around Aleppo, Syria, killed least 92 people since dawn leading Secretary-General of the United Nations Ban Ki-moon to suggest that their use of incendiary weapons and "bunker buster" bombs may be a war crime.

25 September
Russian and Syrian airstrikes in and around Aleppo are using white phosphorus munitions, cluster munitions, incendiaries and "bunker buster" bombs which have killed at least 85 people and so many ambulances were destroyed that humanitarian aid workers and first responders are unable to respond adequately to casualties.
At the U.N. Security Council, United States Ambassador to the United Nations Samantha Power accused Russia of "barbarism" and said the attacks are a war crime, while the Permanent Representative of Russia to the United Nations, Vitaly Churkin, said that the ceasefire's collapse was caused by U.S.-backed forces.

26 September
In the first week since the ceasefire ended, Syrian and Russian aircraft dropped at least 1,700 bombs on Aleppo.
The Russian government said it has radio location data implicating the Ukrainian armed forces in Malaysian Airlines Flight 17's destruction over eastern Ukraine in July 2014 which it said rules out a surface-to-air missile fired from pro-Russian separatist territory in the Ukraine that downed the airliner.

27 September
The U.S. FAA demonstrated its Next Generation Data Communications (also called "Nexcom" or "Data Comm") system, part of its Next Generation Air Transportation System, to the media at Washington Dulles International Airport. They are in 45 airports in the United States, and replace the existing archaic communications system between airline pilots and control towers which relies on hand-written printed forms and radios and 50 more airports will have them by late 2016, to be followed by en route air traffic control centers across the United States, and by mid-2019, voiceless, in-flight communications should be the norm for all commercial air traffic. The FAA estimates savings to air carriers of $10 billion over 30 years.

28 September
An Afghan official announced that an airstrike on a residential building in the Achin District in eastern Afghanistan has killed 13 civilians. U.S. military forces in Afghanistan acknowledge that they carried out a "counterterrorism airstrike" in Achin and are investigating if civilian casualties resulted from it.
The United States conducted a predawn airstrike in northern Somalia, defending troops from Somalia's Puntland region who came under fire from al-Shabaab forces. A U.S. Military spokesman claimed nine al-Shabaab members were killed, while a Puntland police officer says it killed over a dozen, but officials of Somalia's Galmudug autonomous region claim that Puntland had tricked the United States into attacking Galmudug soldiers and that the strike killed 22. The U.S. Department of Defense announced an investigation.
Airstrikes hit two hospitals and a bakery in eastern Aleppo. Both hospitals were out of action, and two patients were killed.
The United States Department of State announced that the United States will suspend bilateral cooperation with Russia unless Russia ends the ongoing Syrian and Russian ground and air assault against eastern Aleppo and restores the 12 September ceasefire.
A team from the Netherlands investigating the July 2014 Malaysian Airlines Flight 17 crash in the Ukraine announced that the airliner was shot down by a surface-to-air missile fired by a Buk missile system smuggled from Russia into a pro-Russian separatist area of eastern Ukraine a few hours before it fired on the airliner, and was returned to Russia the next day. They identified over 100 people involved in the operation and are investigating who ordered that it be fired. The team's findings matched those of American investigators, while the Russians dismissed some of the evidence. They said that its investigation was biased while Russian separatists in Ukraine said they have no access to surface-to-air missiles and said the airliner's destruction was caused by the Ukrainian armed forces.
Unauthorized flights by an unmanned aerial vehicle near Dubai International Airport in the United Arab Emirates, forced the airport to halt operations. Arrivals resumed after 35 minutes and full operations after 67 minutes. The incident prompts UAE officials to tighten the country's regulations regarding drone operations. A similar incident closed the airport on 12 June.

29 September
United Nations officials condemn the 28 September U.S. airstrike in Afghanistan's Achin District, saying it killed 15 civilians and wounded 12 others and demanded an investigation. Although the United States and the Afghan government said that the strike targeted a residential compound used by Islamic State personnel, local Afghan officials said it killed or injured only civilians. U.S. military officials respond that they take "all allegations of civilian casualties very seriously" but said that the Islamic State "put[s] innocent lives at risk by deliberately surrounding themselves with civilians and dressing in female attire."
The Government of Somalia accused the United States of killing 13 Somali soldiers in its 28 September airstrike against al-Shabaab forces and demanded an explanation.
Russia responded to U.S. criticism of its air campaign in eastern Aleppo, by saying that the airstrikes are justified because the United States violated the ceasefire agreement of 12 September by failing to fulfill its promise to separate al-Qaeda- and Islamic State-linked forces from other rebel forces, and because the ceasefire agreement had become unacceptable as it allowed "terrorist groups to take necessary measures to replenish supplies [and] regroup forces."

30 September
Russian and Syrian aircraft conducted heavy airstrikes against rebel-held residential areas in eastern Aleppo, with white phosphorus and cluster munitions. Two more hospitals were hit. The World Health Organization estimates that Russian and Syrian airstrikes have killed 338 people in Aleppo since 19 September. The Syrian Network for Human Rights estimates that Russian airstrikes have killed 3,624 civilians since they began on 30 September 2015, while the Syrian Observatory for Human Rights estimated 3,804 civilians killed. A Russian government spokesman says that Russia has no intention of reducing its involvement in the Syrian Civil War and has no projected end date for its intervention.
Dutch Minister of Foreign Affairs Bert Koenders summons the Russian ambassador to the Netherlands to a meeting in The Hague to complain about Russian Government statements criticizing the Dutch team investigating the July 2014 crash of Malaysian Airlines Flight 17 in Ukraine. Koenders describes the Russian criticism as "unsubstantiated" and "unacceptable," adding, "Given the convincing nature of the evidence, Russia should respect the results that have been presented, rather than impugning the investigation and sowing doubt."

October
1 October
Iranian news sources reported that the Iranian Revolutionary Guard Corps built an attack UAV named Saegheh (Thunderbolt), which is reportedly similar to a RQ-170 Sentinel UAV that crashed there in 2011.
Syrian or Russian aircraft bomb a major hospital known as "M10" in rebel-held eastern Aleppo, Syria, for the second time in a week, killing or wounding more than a dozen patients. Doctors at M10 report that the attack includes barrel bombs, incendiary bombs, and cluster munitions. Syrian government and Russian aircraft have dropped nearly 2,000 bombs on eastern Aleppo in less than two weeks.

2 October
After Kurds downed an Islamic State unmanned aerial vehicle (UAV) in northern Iraq, a booby-trap in it exploded, killing two Kurds and injuring two French paratroopers. It is the first time an Islamic State UAV killed people.
Bulgaria's Civil Aviation Administration said that it was interested in having passenger service in Stara Zagora, Gorna Oryahovitsa, and Ruse, Bulgaria in 2017, with a decision to be made in the coming months.
Bulgaria Air announced the purchase of 10 ATR 72-500 airliners to replace ATR 42s on domestic routes with deliveries from early 2017.
Argentina's national airline Aerolineas Argentinas announced that it converted its existing order for Boeing 737-800 airliners to the Boeing 737 MAX.
In the first major airlift from the Guantanamo Bay base since September 1994, the United States Navy evacuated about 700 non-essential residents and pets from Guantanamo Bay Naval Base in Cuba to Naval Air Station Pensacola, Florida, as Hurricane Matthew approached, with United States Transportation Command aircraft.

3 October
Afghan ground forces fought the Taliban with support from United States Army Boeing AH-64 Apache attack helicopters to hold Lashkar Gah, while U.S. airstrikes were made in Lashkargah and the Afghan Air Force made attacks near Kunduz.
The United States abandoned its collaboration with Russia in Syria due to continued Russian Federation Air Force and Syrian Arab Air Force airstrikes against civilian populations in eastern Aleppo, Syria, withdrawing its coordination personnel in Geneva, Switzerland.
From early 2015, U.S. aircraft flew over 1,000 aerial refueling sorties supporting Saudi aircraft in the Yemeni Civil War, providing tens of millions of pounds of fuel.

4 October
U.S. military officials in Kabul, Afghanistan, announced that a U.S. Army helicopter fired at Taliban insurgents in Kunduz, Afghanistan, defending Afghan ground forces against a Taliban offensive.
Russia announced that its S-300 VM surface-to-air missile systems had joined its air defense forces in Syria, which already had S-200, and Buk missile systems.

6 October
Russia warned that airstrikes in Syria by the U.S.-led coalition on pro-Syrian-government forces would be fired on by its surface-to-air missile systems.
Finland noted what it believes are two separate airspace violations by Russian Sukhoi Su-27 fighters over the Gulf of Finland.
In Montreal, Quebec, Canada, the International Civil Aviation Organization (ICAO) overwhelmingly ratified a 15-year agreement to curb global warming emissions from airliners on international flights by an estimated 2.5 billion tons between 2021 and 2035. The December 2015 Paris Agreement, which would take effect in November 2016 covers domestic flights. The first international climate change pact to govern a single industry will set a baseline based on emissions in 2020, and from 2021 to 2035, airlines that exceed that limit must buy offset carbon credits from other industries, which is expected to cost the industry $5.3 billion annually and as much as $23.9 billion by 2035. Participation is voluntary from 2021 through 2027, but mandatory from 2028 through 2035 but ICAO's 191 member countries must still act on their own to put the agreement's limits into effect. 65 countries including China, the United States, and all 44 member countries of the European Union's aviation conference agreed to participate, while Russia refused to participate in the voluntary phase and India has reservations about the agreement.

7 October
The Government of Finland announced that Russian Sukhoi Su-27 fighters violated Finnish airspace over the Gulf of Finland the previous day. Russia denounced the Finnish claim, claiming that its aircraft remained over international waters.
Estonia announces that a Russian Sukhoi Su-27 fighter violated its airspace for less than a minute earlier in the day.
Russia ratifies a treaty with Syria which gives it an airbase at Khmeimim, among other things, effective from 26 August 2015 when it was signed.
A Russian military official was reported by the Russian newspaper Kommersant as having said that their forces in Syria were under orders to "shoot to kill" if attacked, presumably by U.S.-led coalition aircraft, and was considering redeploying Sukhoi Su-25 attack aircraft to Syria, which had been withdrawn in March.
United States Secretary of State John F. Kerry calls for Russia and Syria to face war crimes charges for bombing civilians in Aleppo, Syria. Russian officials condemn the idea.
Qatar Airways announced a deal with Boeing for up to 100 airliners, including 10 777s and 30 787s for $11.7 billion and up to 60 737s for as much as $6.9 billion. Qatar Airways was frustrated over Airbus A320neo airliner delivery delays, but will continue with A320neos deliveries despite the 737 order.
Bulgaria Air outlines Sofia Airport as its international long-haul base, with flights from March 2017 using a pair of Airbus A330-200s with service to Beijing, China, Bangkok, Thailand, and New York City and is considering services from Sofia to Mumbai, India, and Ho Chi Minh City, Vietnam.
Airbus indicate that three unwanted SriLankan Airlines Airbus A350-900s may be delivered instead to Bulgaria Air.
Turkey's regional carrier Borajet signs a long-term lease agreement with AerCap involving five Embraer E-Jet E2s, consisting of three E190 E2s and two E195-E2s.

8 October
Saudi-led coalition airstrikes on the Grand Hall in Sana'a, Yemen, during a senior Houthi official's father's funeral, killed 140 and injured 534 in the deadliest attack since Saudi Arabia entered the Yemeni Civil War. As before, Saudi officials denied their airstrikes had hit civilians.
Russia vetoes a United Nations Security Council resolution to immediately end the Russian and Syran bombings of Aleppo, Syria.

9 October
An Afghan Army Mil Mi-17 helicopter crashes in northern Afghanistan, killing all eight soldiers on board. The Taliban claims to have downed it, but the Afghan Ministry of Defense says a technical failure caused the crash.
Saudi Arabia promised an investigation into their coalition's deadly 8 October airstrike on a funeral in Yemen, and invited U.S. participation.
The United Nations estimated that Saudi-led coalition airstrikes caused 60 percent of the estimated 3,800 civilian deaths in Yemen since March 2015.

10 October
Airbus announces that its Chief Operating Officer for Customers John Leahy will visit Bulgaria in November, the first visit to southeastern Europe by an Airbus executive.
Air Madagascar announces the resumption of services to China in 2017 with flights between Antananarivo, Madagascar, and Guangzhou, China.

11 October
Airstrikes targeting the rebel-held Bustan al-Qasr neighborhood of Aleppo, Syria, kill between 14 and 16 people. Activists report the use of "bunker buster" bombs during the strikes.
A Piper PA-34 Seneca carrying a student and his flight instructor burst into flames after hitting a utility pole in East Hartford, Connecticut, killing the student and injuring the instructor, who tells investigators that the crash resulted from a physical altercation in the cockpit between the two. The following day, the U.S. National Transportation Safety Board announced that it was transferring the crash investigation to the U.S. Federal Bureau of Investigation as it appeared to be intentional.

12 October
China Southern Airlines finalizes an order with Boeing for twelve Boeing 787-9 airliners, becoming China's first Boeing 787 customer in a deal is worth up to $3,2 billion, for delivery between 2018 and 2020.
Zipline delivered blood to a remote hospital in western Rwanda with an unmanned aerial vehicle (UAV). Zipline planned to launch a nationwide 24 hour UAV delivery service on 14 October, using 15 UAVs, and hope to expand into eastern Rwanda in 2017. The  fixed-wing UAVs have a range, fly below  to avoid aircraft, and use disposable parachutes to drop packages.

13 October
Airbus president Fabrice Brégier and Bulgarian Finance Minister Vladislav Goranov discuss an order for two next generation wide body airliners believed to be Airbus A350-900 worth up to $3 billion for Bulgaria Air, the national airline and included a company office to be located in Sofia.
Former Premier of Alberta Jim Prentice dies Cessna Citation crash shortly after take-off from Kelowna, British Columbia, Canada. The other three occupants also die.

14 October
Malaysia's Minister of Defense, Hishammuddin Hussein, announced that pending completion of negotiations, Malaysia will send combat aircraft and helicopters to the Philippines to support Malaysian troops in operations on Mindanao against the Islamic State-affiliated Abu Sayyaf, Khalifa Islamiyah Mindanao, and Maute factions.
In the previous two weeks, U.S.-led coalition aircraft conducted 66 strikes against the Islamic State near Mosul, Iraq, preparing for a ground offensive to recapture Mosul.
The Saudi-led coalition Joint Incidents Assessment Team (JIAT), an investigative body in Riyadh, stated the coalition wrongly bombed a funeral on 8 October in Sana'a, Yemen, which killed 140 people. The strike occurred because an individual affiliated with the President of Yemen s chief of staff claimed Houthi rebel leaders were attending the funeral, and the coalition air operations center ordered the attack without approval while also ignoring precautionary procedures to avoid attacks on civilians.
The Turkish Air Force conducted strikes against Islamic State targets to support a ground offensive by Syrian opposition groups intending seize Dabiq, Syria.
Syrian Arab Air Force and Russian Federation Air Force raids hit rebel-held neighborhoods in eastern Aleppo, Syria, and an air attack probably by either Russian or Syrian aircraft in Termanin, Syria, kills at least eight people and injures dozens of others. 
A United States Department of Transportation ban announced the previous day affecting Galaxy Note 7 smartphones aboard airliners flying within the United States goes into effect at 12:00 noon Eastern Daylight Time. Samsung had recalled the Galaxy Note 7 because of reports of fires or explosions.

16 October
The Turkish Air Force and international coalition attack Islamic State targets in Dabiq and Arshak, Syria, as Turkish-backed Syrian opposition ground forces capture Dabiq.

17 October
U.S.-led coalition Aircraft and artillery attack Islamic State targets around Mosul, Iraq in preparation for a ground offensive by Kurdish pesh merga forces as well as Iraqi Army and police forces to retake Mosul from the Islamic State begins.
Russian and Syrian government airstrikes in eastern Aleppo, Syria, kill at least 36 people.
The Russian government announced that Russia and the Syrian government will observe a unilateral cease fire from 8:00 a.m. to 4:00 p.m. on 20 October for a "humanitarian pause" to allow people to evacuate to Idlib Governorate from rebel-held areas in Aleppo.

19 October
United States Secretary of Transportation Anthony Foxx announced new rules to protect airline passengers in the United States, to be brought in over several years. Online airline booking services must disclose any biases toward particular airlines, likely to be required in late 2016. Statistics for mishandled bags will be compared to checked bags rather than the number of passengers, likely to be required from January 2018. Airlines must report the number of mishandled wheelchairs, likely to be in effect in 2018. Airlines will have to refund baggage fees if baggage is "substantially" delayed, rather than only if lost, to be required eventually. On-time performance reports will include regional airlines in their networks, also to be required eventually.

19–20 October (overnight)
Turkish Air Force jets carry out 26 strikes against positions of the Kurdish People's Protection Units (YPG) in three villages northeast of Aleppo, Syria, that the Kurdish-led Syrian Democratic Forces had recently captured from the Islamic State. Turkey claims that the strikes destroy nine buildings, an armored vehicle, and four other ground vehicles belonging to the YPG. Reports of the number of casualties vary from 14 plus dozens wounded, according to the Syrian Observatory for Human Rights, to 160 to 200 killed, according to the Turkish armed forces.

20 October
Iraqi Army attack helicopters support ground forces attacking Islamic State positions in Bartella, Iraq, during the offensive to retake Mosul. Islamic State gunfire damages one helicopter, but it lands safely and its crew is evacuated.
Kurdish peshmerga forces suffer increased casualties during the day in combat against the Islamic State during the Mosul offensive. A statement by the Kurdish general command ascribes the increase to a lack of air support, saying that support and air cover by the U.S.-led coalition "were not as decisive as in the past."
Russia and the Syrian government begin a three-day pause in their bombardment of rebel-held eastern Aleppo, Syria, to allow the delivery of humanitarian supplies and the evacuation of around 200 critically injured people. The ceasefire is longer than the eight-hour pause Syria and Russia had announced on 17 October, but less than the five days requested by international aid officials.
The European Union warns Russia of sanctions if its bombardment of civilians in Aleppo, Syria, continues.
American Airlines reported a 56 percent drop in net income for the third quarter of 2016, from 1 July to 30 September, with a net income of $737.000,000. Airplanes flying below capacity, a large tax bill and increased labor costs contributed. Quarterly revenue was $10.6 billion, down 1.1 percent from 2015.
The French company Skylights released the second version of its virtual reality Bravo headset. Trial runs ran the previous year with Air France and KLM.

21 October
A Skol Airlines Mil Mi-8 helicopter with at least 22 occupants crashed in Russia's Yamalo-Nenets Autonomous Okrug, killing at least 19.
Amid ongoing complaints from Iraqi Army and Kurdish peshmerga forces of inadequate U.S.-led coalition aerial reconnaissance and air support for their ground offensive, massive coalition airstrikes were made during the day in support of both forces with aircraft ranging from attack helicopters to United States Air Force B-52H Stratofortress bombers. The coalition's air power reportedly has been spread thin by the scope of the ground offensives.
Bulgaria Air announced services between Sofia in Bulgaria, and Atatürk International Airport in Turkey from January 2017. Turkish Airlines also provide the same service, with a codeshare partnership between both airlines expected in May 2017.
Turkish Airlines suspended services to Najaf, Sulaymaniyah, and Basrah, Iraq, because of military offensives.
The Supreme Administrative Court of Sweden ruled that unmanned aerial vehicles with cameras are surveillance devices requiring a special permit to operate.
Amid border tensions between Colombia and  Venezuela, Venezuelan fighters intercepted Avianca Flight 011 Boeing 787 Dreamliner over western Venezuela en route from Madrid, Spain, to Bogotá, Colombia. The airliner made a sharp turn to return to Colombian airspace. Colombia suspended flights by their aircraft to and from Venezuela and ordered them to avoid Venezuelan airspace, while President of Venezuela Nicolás Maduro ordered an investigation.

22 October
The humanitarian pause in the bombardment of Aleppo, that Russia and the Syrian government allowed on 20 October ended during the evening with Russian Federation Air Force or Syrian Arab Air Force aircraft bombing rebel neighborhoods in Aleppo. Despite being the purpose of the pause, the planned evacuation of injured and civilians did not occur.

23 October
Following diplomatic talks between Colombia and Venezuela, Colombia lifts its flight ban which followed a Venezuelan fighter intercepting an Avianca Boeing 787.
A Morton County, North Dakota, Sheriff's Department helicopter monitoring a Dakota Access Pipeline protest felt threatened by a protester's UAV, which they damaging after shooting at which protestors claimed was to prevent their own activities being filmed.

24 October
The Civil Aviation Authority of the Philippines announced that Singapore's low-cost carrier Jetstar Asia Airways was considering using Manila's Ninoy Aquino International Airport as an operational base in 2017. It would be the first foreign airline to be based in the Philippines. It is already a base for Philippine Airlines, Cebu Pacific, AirAsia Philippines, and Cebgo.
Airstrikes kill at least 13 people in Syria's Idlib Governorate. Russian Deputy Foreign Minister Sergei Ryabkov says that Russia will not plan another "humanitarian pause" soon because rebel forces did not "behave properly". 
A Luxembourg-registered CAE Aviation Fairchild SA227-AT Merlin IVC on a surveillance mission for the French Directorate-General of Customs and Indirect Taxes crashed just after takeoff from Malta International Airport, killing its crew of five.

25 October
The British government endorsed adding a third runway to London's Heathrow Airport which has been under consideration since the 1970s but still requires a vote in Parliament which has been postponed until 2017. It will cost an estimated £17.6 billion and requires 738 homes in Harmondsworth, Longford, and Sipson be demolished.
Disabled United States Army veteran Lisa McCombs, sues American Airlines for a series of incidents between 25 and 27 October 2015 in Manhattan, Kansas, and Dallas, Texas, while travelling to Gulfport, Mississippi, during which the airline refused to allow her to board aircraft operated by their subsidiary Envoy Air with her service dog and publicly humiliated and intimidated her when she protested that her dog was pre-approved to accompany her.
World War II, air show, and test pilot Bob Hoover dies at the age of 94.

26 October
Russian or Syrian airstrikes against a residential area and two schools in Idlib Governorate kill at least 26 civilians, many of them children.
Two Eritrean Air Force pilots defected with their jet fighters to Ethiopia, flying from Eritrea to Mek'ele. Ethiopian Air Force fighters escorted them to Mek'ele after entering Ethiopian airspace.

27 October
The Turkish Government issued warrants for 73 Turkish military pilots suspected of involvement in the 19 July 2016 attempted coup d'état, bringing 45 of them in for detention, and arresting another 29 military pilots already detained for allegedly participating. Eighteen detainees were released, with half on probation.
A Boeing 737-700 serving as the 2016 campaign plane for the Republican nominee for Vice President of the United States Mike Pence, slid off the runway while landing at La Guardia Airport in New York City before the airport's engineered materials arrestor system bed stopped it from reaching the Grand Central Parkway. No-one is injured.

28 October
The right engine of American Airlines Flight 383 Boeing 767-300ER suffers an uncontained failure during the airliner's takeoff roll at O'Hare International Airport in Chicago, Illinois, with pieces of the engine hitting a nearby building, but no one on the ground is injured. The General Electric CF6 engine then catches fire. The crew aborts the takeoff and brings the plane to a stop before the end of the runway and all 170 people and a dog evacuate, with 20 having minor injuries.
Fedex Express Flight 910 McDonnell Douglas MD-10-10F cargo aircraft has its landing gear collapse as it lands at Fort Lauderdale–Hollywood International Airport in Florida. The plane skids to a halt and a fire breaks out that destroys the left engine and wing. The crew of three escaped.
The Turkish Air Force expects to receive its first six F-35A Lightning II fighters in 2018 and has decided to order 24 more for delivery in 2021 and 2022, bring the planned orders to 100.

29 October
An unauthorized UAV near Dubai International Airport in the United Arab Emirates, closed the airport for 84 minutes, along with nearby Sharjah International Airport, for a similar amount of time. It is the third incident in 2016.
Saudi-led coalition airstrikes on a security complex in Hodeidah, Yemen, killed from 43 to 60 people and injured scores more, mostly prison inmates. The coalition said that it was a legitimate target because the Houthis used it as a command-and-control center for military operations.

30 October
Airbus announced its A320neo prototype could land in Bulgaria in November 2016, in its first visit to southeastern Europe after Finland.

31 October
Its wreckage was found the next day.

November
1 November
China-based Donghai Airlines finalizes its order with Boeing for five Boeing 787-9 airliners.

2 November
Bulgaria's announced that Plovdiv Airport will close to all commercial traffic temporarily for runway work beginning in February 2017.
The Lebanese Civil Aviation Authority announces a ban on Samsung Galaxy Note 7 smartphones on its flights due to safety concerns based on the 15 October ban the U.S. Federal Aviation Administration placed on them because of their tendency to catch fire or explode.

3 November
Airstrikes supporting Afghan government troops fighting to push Taliban forces out Kunduz, reportedly kill 30 civilians and injure 25 others in and around the city. One report puts the death toll at up to 100 civilians. U.S. military officials will acknowledge on 5 November that the airstrikes inflicted casualties on civilians, but do not estimate the number of casualties.

5 November
Bulgaria Air announced it is seeking up to six Airbus A320neos, however no deal has been negotiated.
Philippine Airlines announces the retirement of the Airbus A320 from its fleet, beginning in 2017.

6 November
Slovakian Go2Sky announced that in December 2016, it will be the first Slovak Airbus A320 operator when one joins its current four aircraft.
North Atlantic Treaty Organization jets have scrambled over 600 times since 1 January to monitor Russian military air traffic around Europe.

7 November
U.S.-led coalition airstrikes on Islamic State forces near Ayn Issa, Syria, destroy six fighting positions and seven vehicles, including two filled with explosives. 
A United States Department of Defense spokesman said the United States can conduct more airstrikes against Islamic State forces in Libya if the Libyan Government of National Accord requests them. The United States has made over 350 airstrikes against the Islamic State since August, but none since 31 October.

8 November
Seven U.S.-led coalition airstrikes on six Islamic State units near Ayn Issa, Syria, destroy three fighting positions, a vehicle, and a car bomb facility.

9 November
The Syrian Observatory for Human Rights said that a U.S.-led coalition strike in Heisha, Syria, killed over 20 civilians and injured 30. The coalition said it will investigate.
United States Central Command announced that since 2014 its airstrikes in Iraq and Syria killed an estimated 119 civilians, up 64 from previous estimates.

11 November
Bulgaria Air announced transatlantic service to begin in 2017 with either Airbus A330-200 or Boeing 767-300 airliners.
Taiwan-based TransAsia Airways withdrew the Airbus A330-300 from its fleet.
Sabre's computer problems caused check-in and flight delays on Alaska Airlines, American Airlines, JetBlue, Southwest, and Virgin America.

13 November
Airstrikes on rebel-held areas in Aleppo Governorate in Syria knock out a Syrian Civil Defense center in Atareb and kill three people. In the western Ghouta region outside Damascus, an airstrike on a mosque in Khan al-Shih kills two. And an explosion attributed to an airstrike at a crossing point between Syria's Kurdish-held Afrin District and rebel-held parts of Aleppo Governorate kills from 8 to 12 people.

15 November
Syrian government and Russian forces resume offensives as heavy Syrian government airstrikes hit eastern Aleppo while Russian aircraft and cruise missiles hit Islamic State and al-Qaeda-linked rebel group sites manufacturing toxic substances for weapons of mass destruction in Homs Governorate and Idlib Governorate. A Russian aircraft carrier saw combat for the first time ever when Admiral Kuznetsov launched Sukhoi Su-33 aircraft against targets in Syria, from the eastern Mediterranean.
Will Rogers World Airport in Oklahoma City, Oklahoma is closed to commercial traffic for several hours after a former Southwest employee fired in 2015 killed another Southwest employee with a rifle just outside the airport, before dying of a self-inflicted gunshot wound.
Boom Technology unveiled its XB-1 Baby Boom supersonic technology demonstrator, a scaled-down version of a 45-passenger supersonic airliner it hopes to fly  in 2018, and have in service by 2023.

16 November
Syrian government airstrikes on eastern Aleppo, Syria, badly damaged the city's last children's hospital and killed over 87 people. Russia denied involvement, claiming to have conducted none there since 18 October. Russian aircraft and cruise missile strikes continue in Idlib Governorate, where 34 sites have been hit, six people killed and dozens wounded since 15 November.

19 November
An airstrike by an unmanned aerial vehicle in Nangahar Province in eastern Afghanistan killed eight Islamic State personnel including a top Islamic State commander.

20 November
After a U.S. military unmanned aerial vehicle spots Islamic State personnel beheading and shooting civilians in the Mosul, Iraq, area, a U.S. laser-guided bomb scatters the executioners.
Bulgaria Air confirmed the purchase of at least four Boeing 767-300 aircraft to enter service in 2017, and ten Airbus A320, to add to five they already operate.

21 November
The United States authorized Airbus to sell 106 airliners to Iran (up from 17 previously allowed), which it announced the next day.

22 November
Approximately 250 ABX Air cargo aircraft pilots go on strike, as the airline is violated their contract by assigning too many flights. ABX Air said this is illegal. The strike impacts deliveries for ABX Air's two biggest customers, Amazon and DHL Express, as the 2016 Christmas shopping season begins.
The Canadian Government announced it will buy 18 F-18 Super Hornets from Boeing as a stopgap, and had begun the process to replacement its 77 McDonnell Douglas CF-18 Hornet fighters. Lockheed Martin had hoped to sell them F-35 Lightning IIs and although Canada's development contributions will continue, plans to purchase them were cancelled.

23 November
A U.S.-led coalition airstrike disables the fourth of five bridges across the Tigris in Mosul, Iraq, leaving only one bridge, which disrupted Islamic State supply lines.
Spain's national airline Iberia made its last Airbus A340-300 flight.
A U.S. federal judge in Cincinnati, Ohio, ordered ABX Air pilots back to work. Their union says that they will obey the judge's order.

24 November
Turkey agreed to send waterbombers to Israel to assist aerial firefighting against major wildfires. Russia will send two firefighting aircraft. Croatia, Cyprus, Greece, and Italy have sent a combined seven aircraft.
The U.S.-led coalition has conducted over 16,000 airstrikes against Islamic State targets since beginning its air campaign against the Islamic State.

25 November
Watchdog group Airwars announced that U.S.-led coalition air and artillery strikes killed between 84 and 87 civilians and wounded over 160 since an offensive against Islamic State forces in Mosul began on 17 October. The United States Central Command responded that "the liberation of Mosul is an operation that is an order of magnitude larger and more complex than" previous operations, adding that proposed strikes are reviewed using intelligence and surveillance to verify targets beforehand and that coalition strikes destroyed dozens of car bombs and tunnels.
An Evergreen 747 Supertanker aerial firefighting aircraft, based on the Boeing 747-400, arrived in Israel to assist against major wildfires burning for four days. Azerbaijan also sends a firefighting aircraft and Egypt sends two helicopters.

26 November
During the 2016 Butig clashes the Maute group occupied the town of Butig in Lanao del Sur, prompting Philippine Air Force SIAI-Marchetti SF.260 to drop  bombs on the town center.

27 November
Malaysia offered to deploy both fixed wing aircraft and helicopters to the Philippines which allowed the Malaysian Armed Forces and the Armed Forces of the Philippines (AFP) to launch a decisive offensive against Islamic State-affiliated Abu Sayyaf.
During a firefight along the Golan Heights ceasefire line between Israel and Syria between Islamic State-affiliated Syrian rebels and an Israel Defense Forces reconnaissance unit, the Israeli Air Force destroyed a vehicle armed with a heavy machine gun with a rocket, killing four Syrians, the "first substantial fight" between Israeli forces and an Islamic State affiliate in the Syrian Civil War.
Israel approved the purchase of 17 additional F-35 Lightning II fighters.

28 November
The first scheduled commercial airline flight between the United States and Havana, Cuba since the early 1960s takes place as an American Airlines jet arrived at Havana's Jose Marti International Airport. JetBlue initiated their Havana service later in the day.
LaMia Airlines Flight 2933 Avro RJ85 crashed in Colombia after its crew declared electrical and fuel emergencies, killing 71 of the 77 people on board, including 19 members of the Associação Chapecoense de Futebol team, and leaving all six survivors injured. Survivors included three team members, while a fourth died in hospital.

29 November
Iraqi forces advancing on Mosul call on more than a dozen U.S. surveillance aircraft, 43 U.S. combat aircraft, electronic warfare aircraft and  attack helicopters for support against Islamic State targets which expend over 80 precision-guided munitions, destroy four car bombs, four mortars and an Islamic State compound, among other targets.
United begins service between the United States and Havana, with a flight from Newark Liberty International Airport in New Jersey.

30 November
Bulgaria Air announced it is ending aircraft wet-lease agreements in 2017.

December
1 December
A  New York Air National Guard 109th Airlift Wing Lockheed LC-130 Hercules evacuated Apollo 11 astronaut Edwin "Buzz" Aldrin, the second man to walk on the moon, from the South Pole after falling ill while there with a tour group.
Delta made its first flight to Cuba in 55 years, from Miami International in Florida, and arrived at Jose Marti International Airport in Havana. Delta makes inaugural flights from other US airports the same day.
The United States announced it identified 54 additional civilian deaths from  U.S.-led coalition airstrikes in Iraq and Syria from 31 March to 22 October 2016, bringing the number to 173 since the campaign began June 2014.

2 December
Bulgaria Air announced services between Bangkok, Thailand and Sofia, Bulgaria, from April 2017.

4 December
Russian or Syrian airstrikes in Syria's Idlib Governorate kill 50 to 52, two of which hit markets in Kafr Nabl and Maarrat al-Nu'man.

5 December
A Russian Sukhoi Su-33 crashed into the Mediterranean after an arresting cable snapped while landing on the Admiral Kuznetsov. It is the second aircraft Admiral Kuznetsov has lost since beginning operations off Syria.

6 December
Bulgaria Air announced a dry-lease contract with White Airways for two Boeing 777's starting in 2017 to join its four Boeing 767-300s. Negotiations were announced for a Bulgaria – Portugal bilateral agreement to begi in spring 2017.
U.S. President-elect Donald Trump tweeted that the $4 billion to replace the two Air Force One aircraft is too much and should be canceled.
The United States Department of Justice approves the purchase of Virgin America by Alaska Airlines.

7 December
After an engine failure, Pakistan International Airlines Flight 661 ATR 42-500 crashed near Havelian, Pakistan, killing all 47 on boardm including Pakistani actor, singer-songwriter, and televangelist Junaid Jamshed.

8 December
After U.S. pilots drop leaflets warning Islamic State truck drivers, United States Air Force A-10 Thunderbolt II aircraft destroy 168 trucks near Palmyra, Syria, in Operation Tidal Wave II.

10 December
Bulgaria Air said it will add five ATR 72-500s to the 10 it has, and may lease an ATR 72-600.

11 December
Islamic State forces retake Palmyra despite Russian airstrikes on 10 and 11 December. Although human rights organizations have accused them of bombing civilians, Russia claims its pilots were unable to respond effectively as they unwilling to endanger civilians.
Iran Air finalizes a deal to buy 80 airliners from Boeing for $16.6 billion which includes 50 Boeing 737 MAX 8s, 15 Boeing 777-300ERs, and 15 Boeing 777-9s. Iran Air is to receive the first ones in 2018, with deliveries over the next decade.

12 December
In the wake of the 7 December crash of Flight 661, Pakistan International Airlines grounds five ATR 42 and ATR 72 airliners in its fleet after the Pakistan Civil Aviation Authority tested all of them.
With Syrian government and Russian airstrikes, the Syrian government reduced rebel areas in Aleppo to under a tenth of what they were.
The first two Israeli F-35 Lightning II fighters arrived in Israel of 50 planned.
On the day of his inauguration U.S. President-elect Donald Trump tweeted that the F-35's "cost is out of control" and said billions could be saved on military purchases.

13 December
A Marine MV-22 Osprey crashed in the Pacific off Okinawa after an aerial refueling hose damaged a propeller. Its five-man crew was rescued, two with minor injuries. U.S. military grounds its Ospreys in Japan after being called to do so by the Japanese Government on 14 December.

14 December
A ceasefire to allow Syrian rebels and civilians to evacuate Aleppo was broken immediately and Syrian government airstrikes resumed.
Bulgaria Air announced an agreement to buy four cargo aircraft for operations to Europe and Asia, under the Bulgaria Air Cargo name in 2017.
The first Amazon Prime Air delivery to a customer with a UAV arrived 13 minutes after being placed, in the United Kingdom.

15 December
The Chinese Ministry of Defense reported that China's first aircraft carrier, Liaoning, had completed live-fire exercises.

18 December
A Royal Air Force C-130J Hercules became the first fixed wing military aircraft to land on Saint Helena.

20 December
Bulgaria Air announced 16 additional destinations to be added in 2017 when it receives new aircraft.
Since the coalition air campaign against the Islamic State in Iraq and Syria began in August 2014, coalition forces have conducted over 16,000 airstrikes at a cost of $12.5 million per day, killing an estimated 50,000 Islamic State personnel. The coalition has launched an average of 56 strike sorties per day since the campaign began.

22 December
After over four years of airstrikes on homes, schools and hospitals by the Syrian Arab Air Force and the Russian Federation Air Force, Aleppo finally fell.
An drunk Russian who claimed to be meeting his girlfriend drove his car into the Kazan International Airport terminal in Russia, and pursued by security who were on foot, drove past security checkpoints before being arrested at a railway platform.
U.S. President-elect Donald Trump tweeted that he was reconsidering the F-35 Lighting II purchase due cost overruns for the cheaper F-18 Super Hornet.

23 December
Two supporters of the late Libyan leader Muammar Gaddafi hijacked Afriqiyah Airways Flight 209 Airbus A320 during a flight in Libya from Sebha to Tripoli, stated they had a hand grenade and forcing the pilots to fly to Malt where they demanded political asylum and surrendered. No one was injured.
Vesna Vulović, the sole survivor of the 26 January 1972 JAT Flight 367 crash, died at age 66. After the airliner broke up at altitude over Czechoslovakia, she set a record for surviving the longest fall without a parachute, which still stood when she died.

25 December
The Government of Malaysia said that airstrikes in the Philippines on the Abu Sayyaf would be unlikely to help in retaking control of Basilan and Sulu, however discussions continued with the Philippines.
A Russian military Tupolev Tu-154 transport crashes into the Black Sea after departing Sochi International Airport in Russia, killing all 92 on board, including 64 members of the Alexandrov Ensemble "Red Army Choir", Russian humanitarian Elizaveta Glinka, known as "Doctor Liza," who was accompanying medicine for a hospital in Syria, and 9 journalists.
Bulgaria Air announced a reduction in flights to 12 beginning in 2017 while facilities for selling tickets will be added.

26 December
Bulgaria Air announced that its first Boeing 767-300 will be delivered in March 2017, followed by three more in May 2017.
Air Moldova announces that it will buy two more Airbus A320s, to enter service in 2017, bringing their fleet of A320s to four.

29 December
U.S. military officials reported that a coalition airstrike on a van carrying Islamic State personnel in a hospital compound in Mosul, Iraq,  inadvertently killed civilians and announced an investigation into the incident.
A Cessna 525 Citation corporate jet with six on board crashed into Lake Erie while climbing after takeoff from Cleveland Burke Lakefront Airport in Ohio.

31 December
Philippine Airlines announced they will join the Oneworld airline alliance. It is the second southeast Asia airline to join, following Malaysia Airlines.
Coalition aircraft destroyed over 1,200 Islamic State tanker trucks since October 2015 in Operation Tidal Wave II.
According to the United Nations High Commission for Refugees, the Saudi-led coalition made 3,936 airstrikes in Yemen during 2016.
In 2016, U.S. airlines cancelled 1.17% of flights, lost 2.70 bags per 1,000 customers and "bumped" ticketed passengers from overbooked flights at a rate of 0.62 per 10,000 passengers, the lowest numbers recorded in over a decade, while on-time arrival rates and customer complaints also improved.

First flights

January
29 January –Boeing 737 MAX 8

February
6 February – Enstrom TH180
9 February – Airbus A321neo

March
2 March – AgustaWestland AW109 Trekker

April
4 April – Skyleader UL-39 Albi
22 April – Mitsubishi X-2 Shinshin
28 April – Kamov Ka-62

May
17 May – Diamond Dart 450
23 May – Embraer E190-E2
31 May – HAL HTT-40

July
21 July – Tecnam P2012 Traveller

August
17 August – Hybrid Air Vehicles Airlander 10

October
26 October – Beriev A-100

November
4 November – Bombardier Global 7000
21 November – Stratos 714
24 November – Airbus A350-1000

December
17 December – Gulfstream G600
20 December
Avicopter AC352
Boeing BTX-1

Entered service

25 January – Airbus A320neo with Lufthansa
28 June – Comac ARJ21-700 with Chengdu Airlines
15 July – Bombardier CS100 with Swiss Global Air Lines
2 August – Lockheed Martin F-35A Lightning II with the United States Air Force
14 December  – Bombardier CS300 with airBaltic

Retirements
14 January
The Boeing 747 from Air France.

7 October
The last Tupolev Tu-154M airliner is retired by Belavia.

23 November
The Airbus A340 from Iberia.

References

External links

 
Aviation by year